= List of political families in South Africa =

This is a partial list of prominent political families in South Africa.

== Abdurahman and Gool ==
- DrAbdullah Abdurahman (1872-1940), politician and physician; father to
  - Zainunnisa Gool (1897-1963), anti-apartheid political and civil rights leader.

== Aucamp ==
- Cassie Aucamp, leader of the Afrikaner Eenheidsbeweging, father to:
  - Willie Aucamp, Member of Parliament; formerly married to Carol Johnson, Member of Parliament.

== Barlow and Waring ==
- Arthur Barlow (politician) (1876-1962), politician and journalist; father-in-law to
  - Frank Waring (1908-2000), cabinet minister.

== Barry ==
- Joseph Barry (1796-1865). Member of the Legislative Council (Cape Colony) 1854-1864; father to :
  - Charles van Reenen Barry (1831-1878), Member of the Legislative Assembly 1874-1877;
  - Jacob Dirk Barry (1832-1905), Member of the Legislative Assembly 1864-1866 and 1869;
  - Thomas Daniel Barry (1833-1890), Member of the Legislative Assembly 1869-1890;
  - Michael Barry (1837-1897), Member of the Legislative Assembly 1878-1879;

and uncle to :

- John Barry senior (1807-1871), Member of the Legislative Assembly (Cape Colony) 1854-1858;

and great-uncle to :

- John Joseph Barry (1830-1882), Member of the Legislative Council 1866-1878, Member of the Legislative Assembly 1879-1881.

== Bellhouse ==
- Elgar Bellhouse, chairperson of the Progressive Party, father to:
  - Molly Blackburn (née Bellhouse; 1930–1985), political activist.
  - Judy Chalmers (née Bellhouse), Member of Parliament.

== Brand ==
- Sir Christoffel Brand, Speaker of the Cape House of Assembly, father to
  - Johannes Henricus Brand, president of the Orange Free State

== Bunting ==
- Sidney Bunting (1873–1936), chairman of the Communist Party of South Africa, father to:
  - Brian Bunting (1920–2008), Member of Parliament; married to Sonia Bunting (1922–2001), anti-apartheid activist.

== Cachalia and Asvat ==
- Ebrahim Ismail Asvat (died 1940), political activist, father to:
  - Zainab Asvat, political activist.
  - Amina Cachalia (née Asvat; 1930–2013), Member of Parliament; married to Yusuf Cachalia, political activist; mother to:
    - Ghaleb Cachalia, Member of Parliament.
- Ahmed Mohamed Cachalia, political activist, father to:
  - Moulvi Cachalia (1908–2003), political activist.
  - Yusuf Cachalia (1915–1995), political activist; formerly married to Bettie du Toit, political activist; married to Amina Cachalia, political activist; father to Ghaleb Cachalia.
- Ismail Cachalia, Member of Parliament, father to:
  - Firoz Cachalia, Member of Parliament.
  - Azhar Cachalia, anti-apartheid activist.

== Calata ==
- James Calata (1895–1983), political activist, grandfather to:
  - Fort Calata (1956–1985), political activist, member of the Cradock Four.

== Capa ==
- Ndumiso Capa, Member of Parliament; married to Rosemary Capa, Member of Parliament; father to:
  - Ntandokazi Capa, Member of the Eastern Cape Provincial Legislature.

== Coleman ==
- Max Coleman (1926–2022), Member of Parliament; married to Audrey Coleman, activist; father to:
  - Colin Coleman, Goldman Sachs executive.
  - Neil Coleman, trade unionist.

== Dangor ==
- Ebrahim Dangor, activist, father to:
  - Mohammed Dangor, diplomat and politician.
  - Achmat Dangor (1948–2020), author and activist.
  - Jessie Duarte (née Dangor; 1953–2022), Member of the Gauteng Provincial Legislature.

== De Klerk ==
- Jan de Klerk (1903–1979), member of cabinet, father to:
  - Frederik Willem de Klerk (1936–2021), State President of South Africa from 1989 to 1994.

and brother-in-law of Johannes Gerhardus Strijdom.

== De Waal ==
- Pieter de Waal (1837-1909), Member of the Legislative Assembly (Cape Colony) 1894-1895; brother to :
- David Christiaan de Waal (1845-1909), Member of the Legislative Assembly (Cape Colony) 1884-1903; brother of the above, father to :
  - Jan Hendrik Hofmeyr de Waal (1871-1937), Member of the Legislative Assembly (South Africa), Speaker of the House of Assembly.

== Dönges and Pickard ==
- Dr Eben Dönges (1898-1968), cabinet minister, state president-elect, father-in-law of
  - Jan Pickard (1927-1998), Springbok rugby player, Member of Parliament.

== Duncan ==
- Sir Patrick Duncan (1870-1943), politician, governor-general; father to
  - Patrick Duncan (1918-1967), anti-apartheid activist.

== Ebden ==
- John Bardwell Ebden (1787-1873), Member of the Legislative Council (Cape Colony) 1834-1849 and 1854-1858; father to :
  - Alfred Ebden (1820-1908), Member of the Legislative Council (Cape Colony) 1879-1890.

== Ebrahim ==
- Ebrahim Ebrahim (1937–2021), member of cabinet.
- Gora Ebrahim (1936–1999), Member of Parliament, brother to Ebrahim.

== First and Slovo ==
- Julius First, treasurer of the Communist Party of South Africa, father to:
  - Ruth First (1925–1982), anti-apartheid activist; married to Joe Slovo (1926–1995), leader of the South African Communist Party.

== Fischer ==
- Abraham Fischer, prime minister of the Orange River Colony 1907-10, South African cabinet minister 1910-13; father to
  - Percy Fischer, judge, father to
    - Bram Fischer, advocate and activist.

== Fraser and Moleketi ==
- Arthur Fraser, anti-apartheid activist.
- Geraldine Fraser-Moleketi, member of cabinet, sister to Arthur; married to Jabu Moleketi, member of cabinet.

== Gandhi and Ramgobin ==
- Mahatma Gandhi (1869–1948), political activist, grandfather to:
  - Ela Gandhi, Member of Parliament; formerly married to Mewa Ramgobin (1932–2016), Member of Parliament.

== Graaff ==
- David Pieter de Villiers Graaff (1859–1931), minister in the Cape Colony, father to:
  - De Villiers Graaff (1913–1999), leader of the United Party, father of:
    - David de Villiers Graaff, Member of Parliament.
- Sir Jacobus Arnoldus Graaff (1863-1927), Cape Colony and Union cabinet minister, brother of Sir David.

== Goniwe ==
- Matthew Goniwe (1947–1985), member of the Cradock Four, uncle to:
  - Mbulelo Goniwe, Member of Parliament.

== Groenewald ==
- Pieter Groenewald, leader of the Freedom Front Plus, father to:
  - Michal Groenewald, Member of Parliament.

== Gumede ==
- Josiah Gumede (1867–1946), founding member of the South African Native National Congress, father to:
  - Archie Gumede (1914–1998), leader of the United Democratic Front, father to:
    - Donald Gumede, Member of Parliament.

== Hattingh ==
- Hans Heinrich Hattingh, immigrant, Free Burgher of the Dutch Cape Colony, ancestor to:
  - Chris Hattingh, politician, Councillor of the JB Marks Local Municipality, Member of the North West Provincial Legislature, Member of the National Council of Provinces, Member of the National Assembly and Provincial Leader of the Democratic Alliance for the North West Province, father to:
    - Juanita Terblanche, politician, Councillor of the JB Marks Local Municipality, Member of the National Council of Provinces, Member of the National Assembly, Member of the Shadow Cabinet, Branch Chairperson of the Democratic Alliance for JB Marks.
  - Douglas Stephen Bax, clergyman, author and anti-Apartheid activist, Moderator of the Presbyterian Church of Southern Africa, secretary-general of the South African Council of Churches.

== Hendrickse ==
- Allan Hendrickse (1927–2005), leader of the Labour Party, father to:
  - Peter Hendrickse, Member of Parliament.
  - Michael Hendrickse, Member of Parliament.
  - Marie-Louise Hendrickse; formerly married to Desmond Lockey, Member of Parliament.

== Hertzog ==
- General J.B.M. Hertzog (1866-1941), cabinet minister in Orange River Colony and Union of South Africa, prime minister 1924-39; father to
  - Dr Albert Hertzog, cabinet minister 1958-68.

== Hlengwa ==
- Mhlabunzima Hlengwa (1945–2005), Member of Parliament, father to:
  - Mkhuleko Hlengwa, Member of Parliament.

== Hofmeyr ==
- Jan Hendrik Hofmeyr (1845-1909), Cape Colony politician, uncle to
  - Jan Hendrik Hofmeyr (1894-1948), provincial administrator, cabinet minister 1933-48.

== Jansen ==
- Dr Ernest George Jansen (1881-1959), politician, governor-general, married to
- Mabel Jansen (1889-1979). politician and Afrikaans cultural leader.

== Jarvis and Molteno (Cape Colony, Union of South Africa) ==
- Hercules Crosse Jarvis (1803-1889), Member of the Legislative Assembly 1854-1858; father-in-law to :
  - Sir John Molteno (1814-1886), MLA 1854-1878 and 1880-1883, prime minister 1872-1878; father to :
    - John Charles Molteno jr (1860-1924), MLA 1894-1910;
    - Sir James Molteno (1865-1936), MLA (Cape) 1891-1910, Speaker 1908-1910; MLA (South Africa) 1910-1915, Speaker 1910-15.

== Kadalie ==
- Clements Kadalie (1896–1951), founder of the Industrial and Commercial Workers' Union of Africa, father to:
  - Fenner Kadalie (1928–2011), pastor and activist in District Six, father to:
    - Rhoda Kadalie (1953–2022), activist, mother to:
      - Julia Pollak, economist; married to Joel Pollak, editor of Breitbart News.

== Koornhof ==
- Piet Koornhof (1925–2007), member of cabinet, father to:
  - Gerhard Koornhof, Member of Parliament.
- Nic Koornhof, Member of Parliament, cousin to Piet.

== Lorimer ==
- Rupert Lorimer, Member of Parliament, father to:
  - Kate Lorimer, Member of the Gauteng Provincial Legislature.
  - James Lorimer, Member of Parliament.

== Luthuli ==
- Albert Luthuli (c. 1898–1967), leader of the African National Congress and chief of the Zulus of Stanger, South Africa, father to:
  - Albertina Luthuli, Member of Parliament.

== Mahlangu ==
- David Mabhoko Mahlangu (Mabusabesala II), King of the Southern Ndebele–Ndzundza, father to:
  - Cornelius Mahlangu (Mayitjha II; 1947–2005), King of the Southern Ndebele–Ndzundza from 1992 to 2005.
  - James Mahlangu (1953–2005), Chief Minister of KwaNdebele from 1990 to 1994.

== Malan ==
- Francois Stephanus Malan (1871-1941), Cape Colony and Union of South Africa politician and cabinet minister, president of the senate; brother of :
- Charl W. Malan (1893-1933), cabinet minister.

- Dr Daniel Malan (1874-1959), prime minister 1948-54, first cousin once removed of the above.

- Avril Malan (1898-1975), politician; distant cousin to the above, father of :
  - Gen Magnus Malan (1930-2011), military officer, cabinet minister 1980-91.

== Manana ==
- Sibongile Manana, Member of Parliament, mother to:
  - Mduduzi Manana, Member of Parliament.

== Mandela and Machel ==
- Nelson Mandela (1918–2013), President of South Africa from 1994 to 1999, grandfather to:
  - Mandla Mandela, Member of Parliament.
- Winnie Madikizela-Mandela (1936–2018), Member of Parliament, second wife of Nelson.
- Graça Machel, First Lady of Mozambique from 1975 to 1983 and First Lady of South Africa from 1998 to 1999, third wife of Nelson; formerly married to Samora Machel (1933–1986), President of Mozambique from 1975 to 1983.

== Mantashe ==
- Gwede Mantashe, member of cabinet.
- Priscilla Tozama Mantashe (1960–2021), Member of Parliament, sister to Gwede.

== Mashinini ==
- Nomkhitha Virginia Mashinini, political activist, mother to:
  - Tsietsi Mashinini, political activist.

== Matanzima ==
- Kaiser Matanzima (1915–2003), Prime Minister of Transkei from 1976 to 1979, President of Transkei from 1979 to 1986, grandfather to:
  - Lwandile Zwelenkosi Matanzima (c. 1970–2010), traditional king of Western Thembuland.
- George Matanzima (1918–2000), Prime Minister of Transkei from 1979 to 1987, brother to Kaiser, father to:
  - Qaqambile Matanzima (1949–2013), officer in the Transkei Defence Force and South African National Defence Force.

== Matthews ==
- Z. K. Matthews (1901–1968), political activist, father to:
  - Joe Matthews (1929–2010), Member of Parliament, father to:
    - Naledi Pandor (née Matthews), member of cabinet.

== Maynard and Farmer (Cape Colony) ==
- James Mortimer Maynard, Member of the Legislative Assembly 1854-1858; uncle to :
- William Mortimer Maynard Farmer, Member of the Legislative Assembly 1879-1883.

== Mbeki ==
- Skelewu Mbeki (1828 – 1918), the chief of the Mpukane village in the Nqamakwe district from the late 1860s until 1911 and father of:
  - Govan Mbeki (1910–2001), defendant in the Rivonia Trial; married to Epainette Mbeki, political activist; father to:
    - Linda Mbeki, political activist.
    - Thabo Mbeki, President of South Africa from 1999; married to Zanele Mbeki, feminist South African social worker; and father to:
      - Kwanda Mbeki, political activist.
    - Moeletsi Mbeki, political activist.
    - Jama Mbeki, political activist.

== Meer ==
- Fatima Meer (1928–2010), political activist; married to Ismail Chota Meer (1918–2000), Member of the KwaZulu-Natal Legislature; mother to:
  - Shehnaz Meer, judge of the Land Claims Court.
- Farouk Meer, political activist, brother to Fatima.

== Mncwango ==
- Albert Mncwango, Member of Parliament, uncle to:
  - Zwakele Mncwango, Member of Parliament.

== Moosa ==
- Valli Moosa, member of cabinet.
- Mohseen Moosa, Member of Parliament, brother to Valli.

== Morkel ==
- Gerald Morkel (1941–2018), Premier of the Western Cape, father to:
  - Kent Morkel, Member of the Western Cape Provincial Parliament.
  - Craig Morkel, Member of Parliament.

== Motsepe ==
- Augustine Motsepe (1915–2007), chief of the Bakgatla-Ba-Mmakau, father to:
  - Patrice Motsepe, businessman; married to Precious Moloi, businesswoman.
  - Bridgette Radebe (née Motsepe), businesswoman; married to Jeff Radebe, member of cabinet.
  - Tshepo Motsepe, First Lady of South Africa; married to Cyril Ramaphosa, President of South Africa since 2018.

== Motsoaledi ==
- Elias Motsoaledi (1924–1994), political activist; paternal uncle to:
  - Aaron Motsoaledi, member of cabinet.

== Mulder ==
- Connie Mulder (1925–1988), cabinet minister, father to:
  - Pieter Mulder, Member of Parliament.
  - Corné Mulder, Member of Parliament.

== Naidoo and David ==
- M. D. Naidoo (1919–1995), political activist; former husband of Phyllis Naidoo (née David; 1928–2013), political activist.
- M. J. Naidoo (1931–1997), political activist, brother of M. D.
- Ompragash "Tim" Naidoo (1933–2012), political activist; sister of M. D. and M. J.; former wife of Mac Maharaj, member of cabinet.
- Paul David (1940–2020), political activist, brother of Phyllis.

== Nchabeleng ==
- Peter Nchabeleng (1928–1986), political activist, father to:
  - Elleck Nchabeleng, Member of Parliament.

== Ndamase ==
- Tutor Nyangelizwe Vulindlela Ndamase (1921–1997), King in the Western Pondoland, President of Transkei from 1986 to 1994 and descendant of Ndamase.
- Pumelele Ndamase, South African politician and former public servant for the ANC.

== Ngubane ==
- Ben Ngubane (1941–2021), member of cabinet.
- Harriet Ngubane (1929–2007), Member of Parliament, sister to Ben.

== Ntsebeza ==
- Dumisa Ntsebeza, lawyer and political activist.
- Lungisile Ntsebeza, sociologist and political activist, brother to Dumisa.

== Ntuli (Cato Ridge) ==
- Bheki Ntuli, eThekwini politician, uncle to:
  - Mdumiseni Ntuli, African National Congress politician.
  - Thembo Ntuli, African National Congress politician.

== Orpen (Cape Colony) ==
- Joseph Millerd Orpen (1828-1923), Member of the Legislative Assembly 1872-1873, 1879-1881 and 1889-1896; brother to :
- Francis Henry Samuel Orpen (1824-1893), Member of the Legislative Assembly 1881-1883; brother to the above and father to :
  - Redmond Newenham Morris Orpen (1864-1940), Member of the Legislative Assembly 1904-1907.

== Pahad ==
- Amina Pahad, activist; wife of Goolam Pahad, activist; mother to:
  - Aziz Pahad, member of cabinet.
  - Essop Pahad, member of cabinet.

== Pheko ==
- Charlotte Pheko-Lobe, Member of Parliament.
- Gertrude Pheko-Mothupi, Member of the Free State Provincial Legislature, sister to Charlotte.

== Reitz ==
- Francis William Reitz Sr., Member of the Legislative Council (Cape Colony 1850 and 1854-1863 and Member of the Legislative Assembly 1869-1873; father to :
  - Francis Reitz, state president of the Orange Free State, Secretary of State of the South African Republic, President of the Senate, father to
    - Deneys Reitz, cabinet minister.

== Sauer ==
- Jacobus Wilhelmus Sauer (1850-1913), Cape Colony and South African cabinet minister, father to
  - Paul Sauer (1898-1976), cabinet minister 1948-64.

== Schreiner ==
- Olive Schreiner (1855–1920), author and activist; wife of Samuel Cronwright Schreiner (Member of the Legislative Assembly 1901-1910), sister to :
- William Schreiner (1857–1919), Prime Minister of the Cape Colony from 1989 to 1900, father to:
  - Oliver Schreiner (1890–1980), Supreme Court judge, grandfather to:
    - Jenny Schreiner, Member of Parliament.

== Sebe ==
- Lennox Sebe (1926–1994), a chief minister of the Xhosa Bantustan of Ciskei.
- Charles Sebe (died c. 1991), a leader of the Ciskei Defence Force, the military of the Bantustan of Ciskei, and its Director of State Security; younger brother of Lennox Sebe.

== Shaik ==
- Moe Shaik, anti-apartheid activist and civil servant.
- Schabir Shaik, anti-apartheid activist and businessman, brother to Moe.
- Yunus Shaik, anti-apartheid activist and businessman, brother to Moe and Schabir.
- Chippy Shaik, anti-apartheid activist and civil servant, brother to Moe, Schabir, and Yunus.

== Shope ==
- Mark Shope (1919–1998), trade unionist; married to Gertrude Shope, Member of Parliament; father to:
  - Sheila Sithole, Member of Parliament.
  - Ntombi Shope (1950–2003), Member of Parliament.
  - Lyndall Shope-Mafole, Member of Parliament.
  - Lenin Shope, ambassador.
  - Thaninga Shope-Linney, ambassador.

== Sigcau ==
- Botha Sigcau (died 1978), President of Transkei from 1976 to 1978, father to:
  - Stella Sigcau (1937–2006), Prime Minister of Transkei in 1987.
  - Ntsikayezwe Sigcau (1947–1996), Member of the Eastern Cape Provincial Legislature.

== Sisulu ==
- Walter Sisulu, political activist; married to Albertina Sisulu, Member of Parliament; father to:
  - Max Sisulu, Member of Parliament; married to Elinor Sisulu, academic and activist; and father to:
    - Shaka Sisulu, social and political activist, entrepreneur and media personality.
  - Mlungisi Sisulu, business and activist.
  - Zwelakhe Sisulu, activist and journalist.
  - Lindiwe Sisulu, member of cabinet.
  - Beryl Sisulu, diplomat.

== Steyn ==
- Marthinus Theunis Steyn, state president of the Orange Free State 1896-1902, father to
  - Colin Steyn, cabinet minister 1939-48, father to
    - Marthinus Theunis Steyn, administrator-general of South West Africa.

== Stockenström ==
- Sir Andries Stockenström (1792-1864), Cape Colony lieutenant-governor and politician; father to
  - Andries Stockenström, Cape Colony cabinet minister 1877-1878;

and father-in-law to :

  - Charles William Hutton (1826-1905), Cape Colony cabinet minister;
  - Sir Sidney Godolphin Alexander Shippard (1838-1902), colonial administrator.

== Tambo ==
- Oliver Tambo, leader of the African National Congress; married to Adelaide Tambo, Member of Parliament; father to:
  - Dali Tambo, activist and media personality.
  - Nomatemba Tambo, diplomat and politician.

== Verwoerd and Boshoff ==
- Hendrik Verwoerd (1901–1966), Prime Minister of South Africa from 1958 to 1966, married to Betsie Verwoerd (1901–2000); grandfather to:
  - Wilhelm Verwoerd II; formerly married to Melanie Verwoerd, Member of Parliament.
  - Anna Boshoff (died 2007); married to Carel Boshoff (1927–2011), founder of Orania; mother to:
    - Carel Boshoff IV, Member of the Northern Cape Legislature and leader of Orania.
    - Wynand Boshoff, Member of Parliament.

== Watermeyer (Cape Colony) ==
- Philip Johannes Andries Watermeyer (1825-1897), MLA 1858-1883 and 1887-1878; uncle to :
  - Egidius Benedictus Watermeyer (1824-1867), MLA 1854-1855; brother to :
  - Frederick Stephanus Watermeyer (1828-1864), MLA 1858, 1861-1863; brother to :
  - Carel Philip Watermeyer jr (1842-1893), MLA 1874-1879; brother to :
  - Gottfried Andres Watermeyer, father to :
    - Egidius Benedictus Watermeyer (1855-1932), MLA (Cape) 1908-1910; MLSA (South Africa) 1910-1915.

== Zulu and Buthelezi ==
- Dinuzulu kaCetshwayo (1868–1913), King of the Zulus from 1884 to 1913, father to:
  - Solomon kaDinizulu (1890–1933), King of the Zulus from 1913 to 1933, father to:
    - Mcwayizeni Zulu (1931–1999), Member of Parliament.
    - Cyprian Bhekuzulu (1924–1968), King of the Zulus from 1948 to 1968, father to:
      - Goodwill Zwelithini (1948–2021), King of the Zulus from 1971 to 2021, father to:
        - Misuzulu Zulu, King of the Zulus since 2021.
  - Magogo kaDinuzulu (1900–1984), mother to:
    - Mangosuthu Buthelezi, Chief Minister of KwaZulu, father to:
      - Angela Buthelezi, Member of Parliament.
  - Phikisele Harriet kaDinuzulu; married to Pixley ka Seme (1881–1951), president of the African National Congress.

== Zuma and Dlamini ==
- Jacob Zuma, President of South Africa from 2009 to 2018, father to:
  - Duduzane Zuma, businessman and media personality.
  - Duduzile Zuma-Sambudla, politician and media personality.
  - Thuthukile Zuma, civil servant and media personality.
  - Gugulethu Zuma-Ncube, media personality; daughter-in-law of Welshman Ncube, leader of Movement for Democratic Change – Ncube.
- Nkosazana Dlamini-Zuma, member of cabinet, formerly married to Jacob, mother of Thuthukile and Gugulethu.
- Hlobisile Dlamini, sister of Nkosazana.

== Other marriages ==
- Rusty Bernstein and Hilda Bernstein
- Steve Biko and Mamphela Ramphele
- Benny Boshielo and Polly Boshielo
- Andries Botha and Sandra Botha
- Hendry Cupido and Pauline Cupido
- Paul Ditshetelo and Celia Ditshetelo
- Henry Fazzie and Buyiswa Fazzie
- Sipho Gcabashe and Lungi Mnganga-Gcabashe
- Chris Hani and Limpho Hani
- Ahmed Kathrada and Barbara Hogan
- Ronnie Kasrils and Eleanor Kasrils
- Jacob Khawe and Thuliswa Nkabinde-Khawe
- Jacob Khawe and Khusela Diko
- Gcina Malindi and Caroline Nicholls
- George Mashamba and Joyce Mashamba
- Zibuse Mlaba and Bongi Sithole-Moloi
- Mendi Msimang and Manto Tshabalala-Msimang
- Abraham Mzizi and Gertrude Mzizi
- Bulelani Ngcuka and Phumzile Mlambo-Ngcuka
- Sifiso Nkabinde and Nonhlanhla Nkabinde
- Charles Nqakula and Nosiviwe Mapisa-Nqakula
- Mamabolo Nwedamutswu and Thembi Nwedamutswu
- Mathole Motshekga and Angie Motshekga
- Griffiths Mxenge and Victoria Mxenge
- Mathews Phosa and Pinky Phosa
- Vusi Pikoli and Girly Pikoli
- Amichand Rajbansi and Shameen Thakur-Rajbansi
- Zola Saphetha and Ntombikayise Sibhidla-Saphetha
- Steve Tshwete and Pam Tshwete
- Ben Turok and Mary Turok
- Tony Yengeni and Lumka Yengeni
