= M. J. Naidoo =

South African activist (1931–1997)

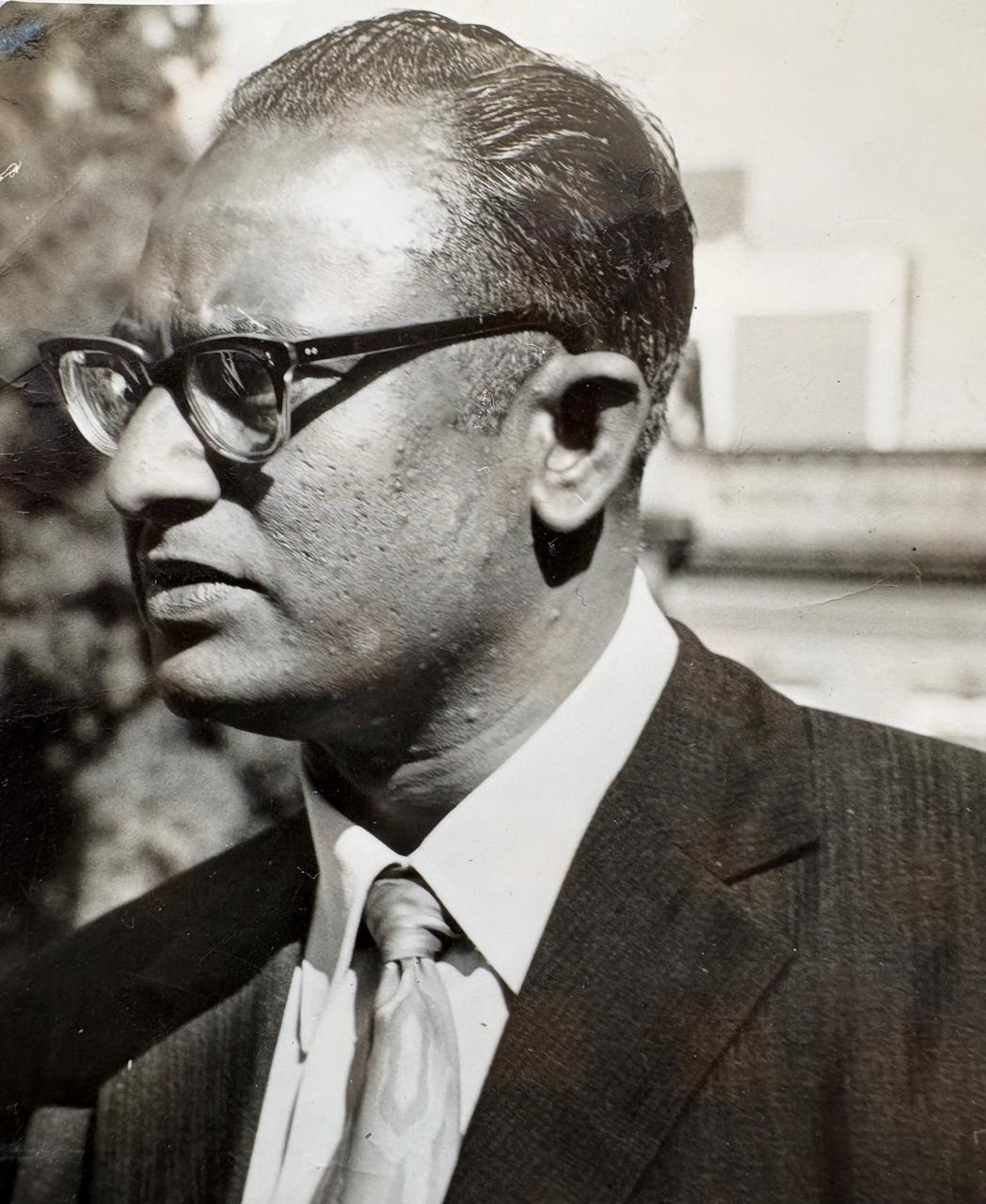
- Naidoo (date unknown)

President of the Natal Indian Congress

Personal details
- Born: 1931
- Died: 1997 (aged 65–66)
- Known for: member of the Durban Six
- M.J. Naidoo's Durban City Key Locations in M.J. Naidoo's History represented spatially 1 Sastri College; 2 208 Scala Mansions; 3 Red Square; 4 Passive Resistance Park; 5 M.J. Naidoo's Legal Practice; 6 Curries Fountain Sports Ground; 7 M K Gandhi Library; 8 British Consulate; 9 Non-European Section of Natal University College; 10 Indian Market, Victoria Street; 11 Lakhani Chambers

Mooroogiah Jayarajapathy Naidoo (1931–1997) was a South African Indian anti-apartheid activist and lawyer. Commonly known as "MJ", Naidoo played an active role in the re-launched Natal Indian Congress (NIC) in October 1971. Under his leadership, the NIC contributed towards what has been dubbed the "Durban Moment", when, in a east coast harbour city, a variety of activists from different ideological positions, joined forces against apartheid, oppression and exploitation. In January 1973, over 100 000 factory and dock workers began a mass action campaign, which was supported by student protest and community based activism. Rick Turner described this as a grassroots shift in liberation perceptions, and Steve Biko suggested that if you are oppressed, then you are black. A decade later, M.J. Naidoo would again be in the news, as part of the Durban Six and a defendant in the Pietermaritzburg Treason Trial. M.J. died in 1997, aged 66.

== Time Line ==
=== 1960 ===
The Rivonia Trial, pass laws, bans, and forced removals and resettlements had entrenched the apartheid government. The implementation of the group areas act, the displacement of the magazine barracks community to Chatsworth had uprooted many Durban families.

=== 1970 ===
After a decade of inactivity, the NIC was revived at a mass meeting held in the Bolton Hall in 1971. This renewal was initially led by Mewa Ramgobin and later by George Sewpersadh, (both of whom had to step back after state banning orders), and M.J. Naidoo stepped into the role as NIC President from 1973 to 1978. With Naidoo at the helm of the NIC, much of the 1970's was spent rebuilding organizational structures and strengthening alliances, and opposing the South African Indian Council, who were seen as a stooge of the Apartheid government.

=== 1980s ===
In 1981, NIC leadership challenged the South African Indian Council and the state's Tricameral Parliament with boycotts and protests. Another generation of black people of South Africa had grown up under oppression, and this decade saw more community based civic organizations, rent protests and campaigns (e.g. the Release Mandela Campaign and the anti-South African Indian Council (SAIC) campaign). In 1980 a country wide school boycott campaign began. and state repression followed with further detentions without trial . The state sought to both to both repress resistance and to co-opt moderate leaders. Prime Minister P. W. Botha's "total strategy" envisaged a 'Coloured' and 'Indians' house of parliament within a 'multiracial state. The United Democratic Front (UDF) was formed, and M.J. Naidoo was the Natal regional representative, lead discussion about participation or rejection. The NIC would advocate non-participation on tactical grounds. State's repression meant that NIC leaders were detained without trial. Together with Archie Gumede, Billy Nair, George Sewpersad, and Mewa Ramgobin, Naidoo launched an application against the arrest and was released. Expecting re-arrest, he and five fellow detainees went into hiding. New orders were passed for their re-arrest. They decided to seek refuge in the British Consulate and escalate the situation to International proportions.

On 13 September 1984 the six detainees entered the British Consulate, requesting an interview with the Consul Gereral, Simon Davey. The six had been released after a court ruled their previous detention order was invalid. Louis Le Grange (minister of police) sought to re-detain them, again without trial. The Durban Six used media coverage to draw attention to their plight. Prime Minister Thatcher, an ally of Apartheid SA, was deeply embarrassed, but it could not turn out the refugees. On 6 Oct 1984 M.J. Naidoo, Mewa Ramgobin and George Sewpersad left the consulate, (although Billy Nair is also mentioned).

The remaining three, Archie Gumede, Billy Nair and Paul David, conducted an interview via a smuggled radio transmitter which brought the world's attention onto Durban. On 10 December 1984, detention notices against the Durban six were withdrawn (and the UN Convention Against Torture was adopted,) Desmond Tutu delivered his Nobel Prize Lecture and the remaining three activists left the consulate. on the 13 December.

In 1985, the Consular Six and another 10 other activists were charged for treason at the Pietermaritzburg Treason Trial. Here the recently formed United Democratic Front (and affiliates) were put in the dock, with the state attempting to clamp down on activists and destroy the organization. This trial been described as the largest and most significant political trial in South Africa, since the Rivonia Trial.

As part of the international campaign to secure their release, the United Nations Security Council unanimously passed UN Security Council Resolution 560 on 12 March 1985 calling for “the Pretoria régime to withdraw the charges of "high treason" instituted against the United Democratic Front officials, and calls for their immediate and unconditional release”

...it is axiomatic that the 1984 British Consulate ‘sit-in’ by the NIC brought international focus to the evils of the apartheid system and the repressive security laws. It gave new impetus to anti-apartheid groups both locally and abroad, and renewed calls for the release of Nelson Mandela and others.

— M J Naidoo, Quoted by Desai & Vahed in "The Natal Indian Congress, the Mass Democratic Movement and the Struggle to Defeat Apartheid: 1980–1994", Natal Witness, May 22, 1990

M. J. Naidoo, was ousted as NIC president in 1988

== Family history ==
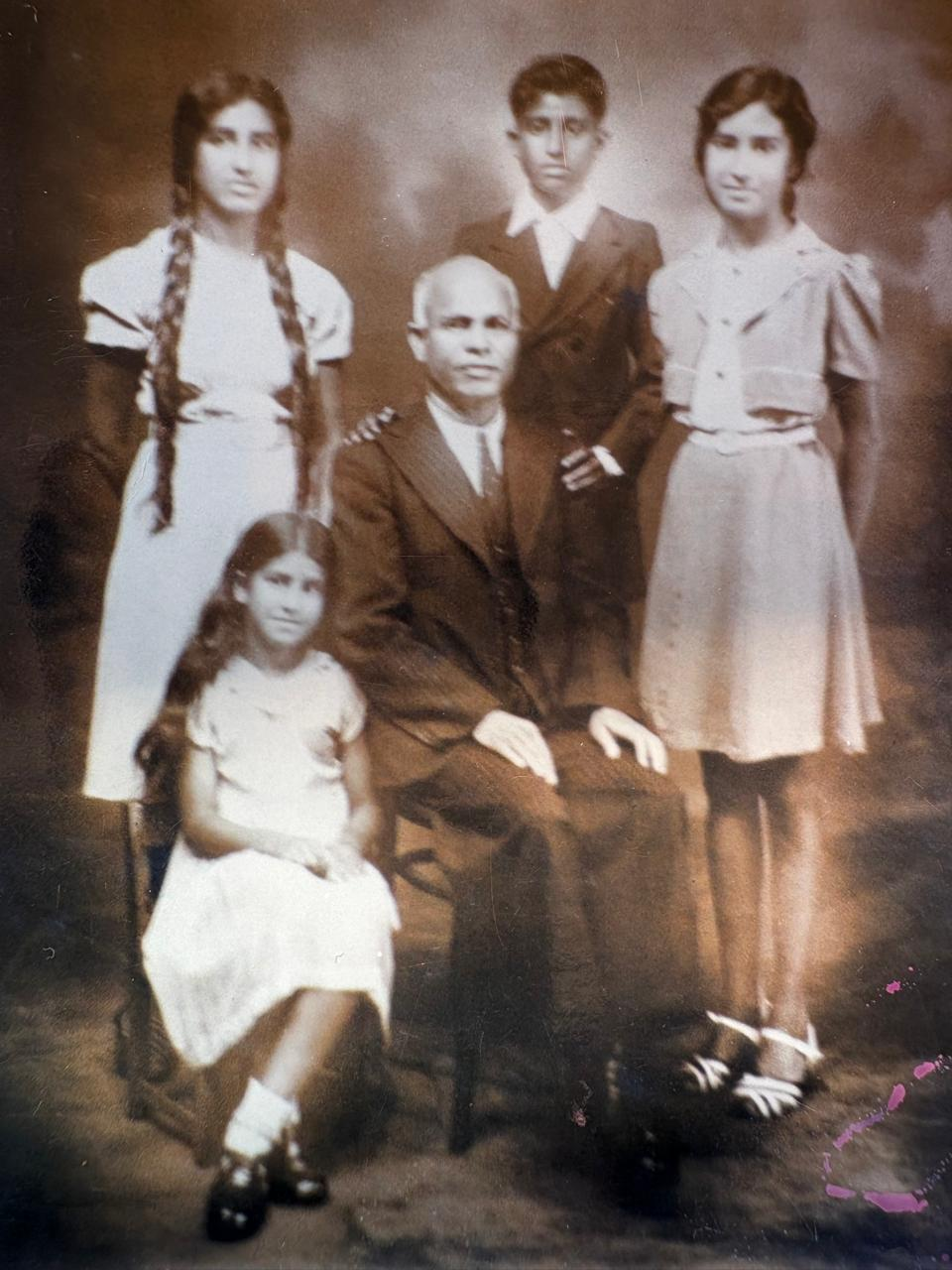
R.M. Naidoo with his children

MJ Naidoo was a descendant of indentured labourers who arrived in South Africa between 1860. His grandfather, Rungiah Naidoo, became a market gardener after completing his period of indenture. His father, R.M. Naidoo, was a shopkeeper and land estate agent who established his business in the central Indian commercial area and lived in a flat in Prince Edward Street, Durban.

R.M Naidoo was particularly engaged with the Indian municipal workers living near the beach in Magazine Barracks, which had a significant concentration of Tamil people in South Africa, and he became the secretary of Durban Indian Municipal Employees Society (D.I.M.E.S.).

M.J. Naidoo was born in 1931 into an orthodox religious family. He had a few siblings, including Ompragash (Tim), M.P. (George) and M.D. M.J.'s birth coincided with the great depression, and his father (R.M.) lost his business and retreated to Mount Edgecombe, where he had earlier purchased a small farm with a spacious homestead. When MJ’s parents died, he was sent to live with relatives. His older brother, M.D. Naidoo was already active in politics and deemed an unsuitable guardian by the family for his younger siblings.

M.J. Naidoo enrolled in Sastri College, South Africa's first Indian High School, in Winterton walk, Durban.

After matric, M.J. Naidoo enrolled at the Non European Section of Natal University College (NESNUC), the forerunner to University of Natal. African, Indian and Coloured (black students) classes were held at Sastri College and were conducted after school hours and on weekends. Books were brought in from the main library, and a small library was improvised for NESNUC students. M.J. became the president of the SRC of the Black section, which was affiliated with NUSAS. When NUSAS disaffiliated from the International Union of Students because the body was falling under communist sway, the Black SRC disaffiliated from NUSAS itself. As SRC president, Naidoo could have represented fellow students at the 1956 International Students Conference in Bandung, but his passport application was turned down.

== Early Activism in the family ==
M.J. Naidoo's activist brother lived in a flat in town and had set up a "liberal study group" and joined a left book club. This flat (which become the de facto headquarters of both the Party and Congress) was where M.J. was exposed to well known political activists, as they frequently visited the premises. People such as J.B. Marks, Dawood Seedat, and Cassim Amra. M.J. Naidoo became involved in the group and sold The Guardian newspapers, the official organ of the Party, and he attended the meetings at the Red Square and Curries Fountain where Dr. Dadoo, Chief Luthuli, J.N. Singh, Monty Naicker, Ismail Meer, A.I. Meer, Debi Singh, and his brother spoke. MJ also came into contact with trade Unionists, A.A. Naidoo, George Poonen, his wife Vera, Billy Peters, and R.D. Naidoo.

In 1956 (M.D. Naidoo) returned from the UK with the intent to become an advocate, and was admitted to the bar in 1957. In the following years after the Sharpeville massacre, the state of emergency, and the Rivonia Trial, leadership would be banned and silenced, including M.D. Naidoo who was imprisoned for six years at Robbin Island.

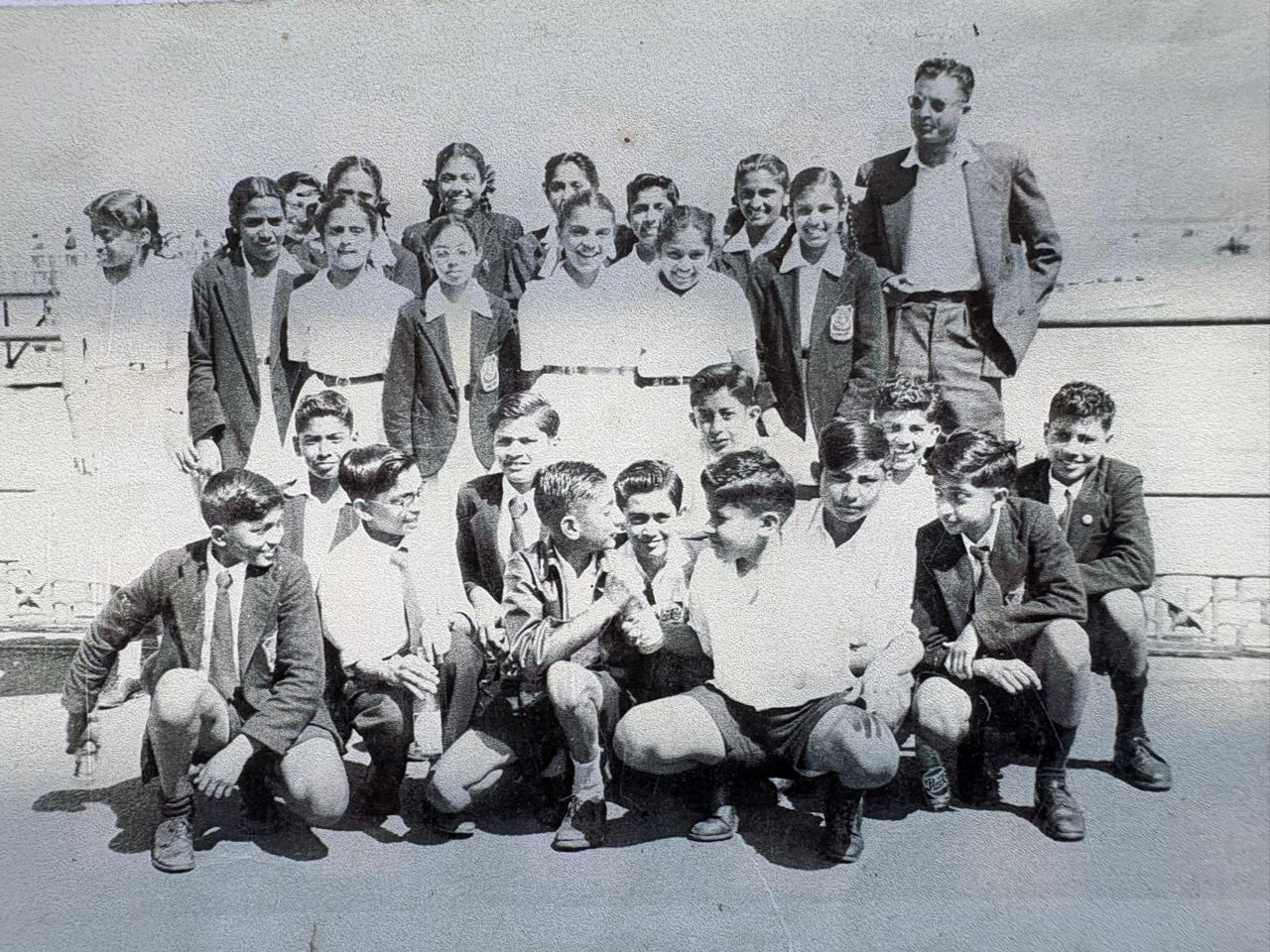
M.J. Naidoo as a teacher at Surat Hindu school with students

As a young man, M.J. Naidoo sought to emulate his brother, but did not have the financial means to enter law. Instead he became a school teacher and taught for eight years at the Surat Hindu School, where he met Sanna Perumal (his future bride). In 1957, M. J. Naidoo resigned from teaching and joined a legal firm as an articled clerk and re-enrolled at the NESNUC. In 1958, he married Sanna who, with a permanent teaching post, was able to support the family while Naidoo focused on legal and community work. This would eventually lead to a private practice.

M.J. Naidoo's sister Tim Naidoo married Mac Maharaj in the same year.

All four of MJ’s children, Jayendra, Kammila, Melanie, and Ravindra, had become involved in political activism and thereafter played important roles in the transformative processes in the new South Africa that followed.

M.J. died on June 16 (Youth Day) 1997 at the age of 66, after a short bout of pneumonia.
