= Phyllis Naidoo =

South African anti-apartheid activist (1928–2013)

Dr. Phyllis Naidoo OLS
- Born: Phyllis David; 5 January 1928; Estcourt, Natal, Union of South Africa
- Died: 13 February 2013 (aged 85); Durban, KwaZulu-Natal, South Africa
- Education: University of Natal
- Occupations: anti-apartheid activist, author, lawyer, educator, writer and human rights activist
- Employer: University of Zimbabwe (1983)
- Known for: Anti-apartheid activism
- Notable work: Waiting to Die in Pretoria (1990); Izinyanya: A Millenium Diary in the Year of Older Persons (1992); Le rona re batho (1992); Footprints in Grey Street (2002); 156 Hands that built South Africa (2006)
- Political party: Non-European Unity Movement; Natal Indian Congress; South African Communist Party uMkhonto we Sizwe
- Spouse: M. D. Naidoo (m. 1958; div. 1977)
- Relatives: Paul David (brother)
- Honours: Order of Luthuli (2003)

Phyllis Naidoo OLS (5 January 1928 – 13 February 2013) was a South African Indian anti-apartheid activist, author, lawyer, educator, writer and human rights activist. She was known for her active participation in the liberation movement and is best known for her role in the anti-apartheid movement. She also served as a member in Non-European Unity Movement, Natal Indian Congress, South African Communist Party and uMkhonto we Sizwe.

== Biography ==
Phyllis was born in Estcourt, Uthukela District Municipality, KwaZulu-Natal, on 5 January 1928 in an orthodox family background which gave importance to strict adherence to religious fundamentals. Her father, Simon David, served as a school teacher and later as a principal. Her mother was deemed as a devout Catholic who was an housewife. Her family consisted of 10 children. Phyllis lived with her family members in Estcourt, Pietermaritzburg and later they moved to Tongaat. Her grandfather had been an indentured Indian Tamil-language speaker who was selling vegetables grown in his farm garden for his livelihood. Some sources indicate that both her grandparents had been indentured Indian labourers.

She developed community service volunteering during her high school years while studying at the Woodlands Secondary School and had developed the passion to help people diagnosed with diseases such as tuberculosis. After completing her high school, she went to work voluntarily for the charity organization, Friends of the Sick Association. She joined Friends of the Sick Association after being convinced by one of her school teachers. She was also sent to King George V Hospital (now called as Inkosi Dinuzulu Hospital) in Durban to obtain training as a tuberculosis nurse aid.

She married M. D. Naidoo, a fellow South Africa Indian political activist and lawyer in 1958. However, the marriage was officially ended in 1977 when M. D. Naidoo discovered that his wife had an extramarital affair during his imprisonment. The couple was separated in 1977 after filing for divorce.

== Career ==
Phyllis eventually prioritized politics over religion and she became closely associated with the liberation movement during the 1940's. Many of her colleagues who had been part of the Friends of the Sick Association joined the Civil Disobedience Campaign initiated by the South African Indian Congress with the intention to challenge the Asiatic Land Tenure and Indian Representation Act, an act which was passed to enforce residential segregation. It was the growing awareness of the strong opposition to the introduction of Asiatic Land Tenure and Indian Representation Act, that induced active political campaigning and political activism for Phyllis. She joined the Non-European Unity Movement in 1950. She also gained awareness about the political events unfolded in the 1956 Treason Trial, where political prisoners including Nelson Mandela were arrested in a raid and accused of treason in South Africa. It was during this time she was pursuing Bachelor of Arts degree in the Non-European section at the University of Natal and she also vowed to create a taskforce in the form of a Human Rights Committee at the University of KwaZulu-Natal after observing the tragic events occurred during the 1956 Treason Trial. During her stint at the University of KwaZulu-Natal, she raised funds for political detainees, prisoners who were facing criminal trial charges on accounts of various apartheid related crimes or apartheid activism. She also subsequently, joined hands with the Natal Indian Congress, where she took the role of a writer narrating speeches in written form for her fellow comrades. She met fellow anti-apartheid activists George Sewpersadh, Steve (Nandha) Naidoo and M. D. Naidoo when she joined the Natal Indian Congress. She also collaborated with the South African Communist Party in 1961 and she maintained strong objection to the implementation of the Bantu Education Act, an act which had been enforced as a South African segregation law of the apartheid system whose main purpose was to limit the educational opportunities of Black children in across South Africa in a typical quota basis. She worked alongside fellow activists Dorothy Nyembe, Moses Kotane and Florence Mkhize when she joined the South African Communist Party.

She then made a decision to join uMkhonto we Sizwe, at a critical phase in South Africa's history, when political parties and organizations were officially banned in 1961 under the apartheid regime in South Africa. The situation was aggravated with the implementation of controversial Preservation of Coloured Areas Act enacted by the Parliament of South Africa which further strengthened racial segregation legislation of South Africa during the apartheid regime. She was banned in 1966 for her continuous activism against apartheid and her official ban was part of the crackdown and oppression to limit the freedom of speech which was rampant during that period of time in South Africa. Her spouse M. D. Naidoo was arrested in 1967 and charged with violating the Suppression of Communism Act and was sent to a prison sentence to Robben Island. Phyllis was under the house arrest, as she was banned from entering public places until 1976 and she also reportedly faced harassment from security police officers during her detention and house arrest period. Her house was raided at least fourteen times when she was under house arrest. During the time when she was under house arrest, she began studying law and obtained a degree in law in 1973. She collaborated with fellow anti-apartheid activist Archie Gumede forming a partnership to carryout legal practice. She became a qualified lawyer in 1973, however she was not allowed to appear in court proceedings due to her prevailing ban and she could not start practicing law due to the ban. She also set up her own legal practice in Durban's Grey Street Area after the end of her 10 year ban and her legal practice employed many ex political prisoners including Jacob Zuma. It was revealed that the political prisoners and activists who were jailed at the Robben Island had approached Phyllis Naidoo in seek of job employment and they were eventually recruited to Phyllis law firm as messengers.

She officially started practicing law in 1976, but was advised to go into exile because of the imminent threat of facing sanctions and she fled across the border into exile in Lesotho with other form political prisoners in 1977. After landing in Lesotho, she joined the African National Congress, where she proceeded with her social welfare work to escort the members of South African Communist Party and the African National Congress safely from South Africa to Lesotho. She was assigned the job role to serve as chief legal aid counsel to the Government of Lesotho. She had to later relocate herself to Zimbabwe in 1983 after Lesotho was subject to militant attacks from neighboring South Africa. It was reported that a coordinated campaign of bombing conducted by both South Africa Air Force and South Africa Army under the military campaign Maseru Raid, which targeted the homes in Lesotho believed to have provided shelter and accommodation to the members of the African National Congress. During her stay in Lesotho, she was severely wounded by a parcel bomb which had been sent to her by an apartheid security officer and there were a total of six people in the room where the bomb was exploded. During the explosion, fellow anti-apartheid activist John Osmers had lost his right hand. She sustained scars in her body and her hearing abilities were affected after falling victim to parcel bomb explosion. She was informed that her life could be at risk if she continued to stay in Lesotho, as the intelligence reports warned her about a possible political assassination targeting her, and hence she pleaded with the Government of Lesotho to evacuate her safely to Zimbabwe in 1983. Upon her arrival to Zimbabwe, she began teaching law to university students at the Law Department of the University of Zimbabwe for a brief stint. During her stay in Zimbabwe, she also wrote speeches to cater to the requirements of African National Congress leaders and engaged in political work for the military wing of the African National Congress.

She spent 13 years in exile between 1977 and 1990 in across both Zimbabwe and Lesotho. She returned to her homeland South Africa from exile in 1990 and vowed to cooperate with the liberation movement. During her illustrious career, she was hailed as one of the prominent anti-apartheid activists in South Africa and she was also accompanied by the likes of Strini Moodley and Navi Pillay (Navanetham Pillay) for the rallies and marches against apartheid policies of the Government of South Africa. She authored books with the underlying themes on reconciliation and transformation on the struggle against apartheid, and some of her works include Waiting to Die in Pretoria (1990), Izinyanya: A Millennium Diary in the Year of Older Persons (1992), Le rona re batho (1992), Footprints in Grey Street (2002), 156 Hands that built South Africa (2006), Footprints beyond Grey Street (2007) and Enduring Footprints (2009). She advocated for the abolishing of capital punishment in South Africa when the political prisoners were facing death sentences and she published the book Waiting to Die in Pretoria (1990), reflecting about the cruelty of capital punishment. Some of the books written and published by her were couriered to the libraries in Cuba during her lifetime.

In 2003, Phyllis was conferred with the Order Of Luthuli from the Government of South Africa, in recognition for her services and contributions to Human Rights and the struggle for liberation in South Africa.

== Death ==
She died on 13 February 2013 due to heart failure at the age of 85 in Durban, KwaZulu-Natal. Prior to her death, she underwent heart surgery and was kept on a ventilator for several weeks at the Chief Albert Luthuli Hospital. However, her medical condition worsened and was admitted in the intensive care unit after falling into coma stage. Following her death, African National Congress dipped its official party flag in half-mast as a mark of respect. University of KwaZulu-Natal conducts Phyllis Naidoo Memorial Lecture annually as a tribute to Phyllis Naidoo's contributions towards struggle for liberation.

== See also ==
- List of political families in South Africa
