= Red Square (Durban) =

Red Square in Durban is a "landmark" of the struggle

Red Square was a "landmark" of the struggle against apartheid in Durban, South Africa. This public space, known as "Red Square" because of the "Rooi gevaar", is now occupied by a five-story parking garage. Red Square was located at the intersection of Monty Naicker, Dr A B Xuma and Yusuf Dadoo streets (Map).

== Significance ==
The square was a gathering point for Natal Indian Congress (NIC), African National Congress (ANC) and South African Communist Party (SACP) public meetings in the late 1940s and 1950s. Notable protest movements originated from the "Red Square", including the Passive Resistance Campaign, which was followed by the Defiance Campaign.

NIC members protested at mass rallies and land occupations (at great personal cost). Their actions would expose the duplicitous behaviour of Jan Smuts and the state Thuggery, intimidation and violence by locals would follow. The 1973 Durban strikes also originated from Red Square, as workers consulted union leaders based at Lakhani Chambers. These strikes would be the first time that workers from the packaging, transport, ship repairs, textile and clothing sectors had made their demands heard, since Sharpville Massacre. These strikes would later be seen as the beginning of the black trade union movement, and an upsurge in new forms of activism

Today, a five-story parking garage covers the remains of the public space which was used for gatherings, rallies and speeches.
