= Sastri College =

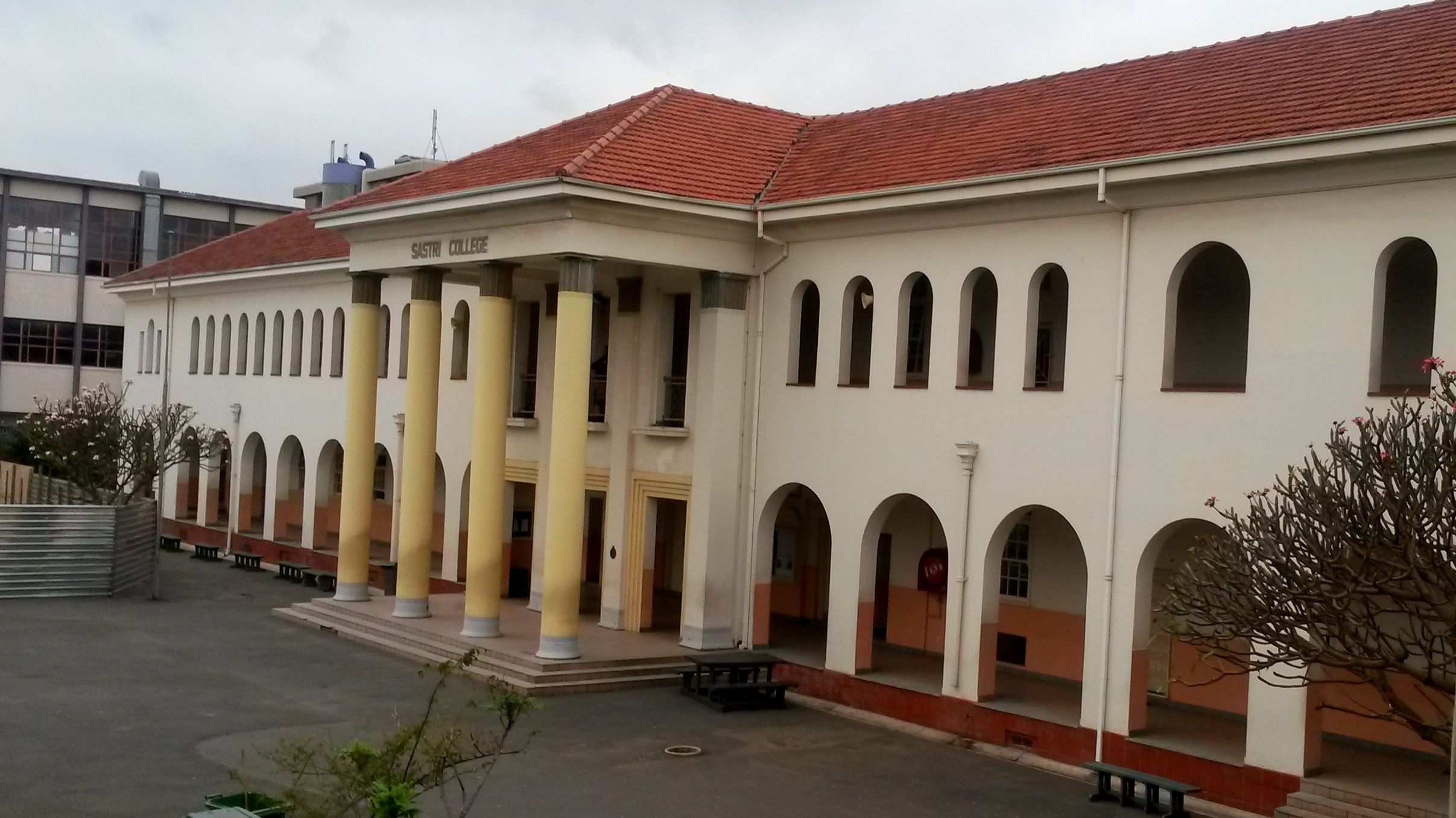
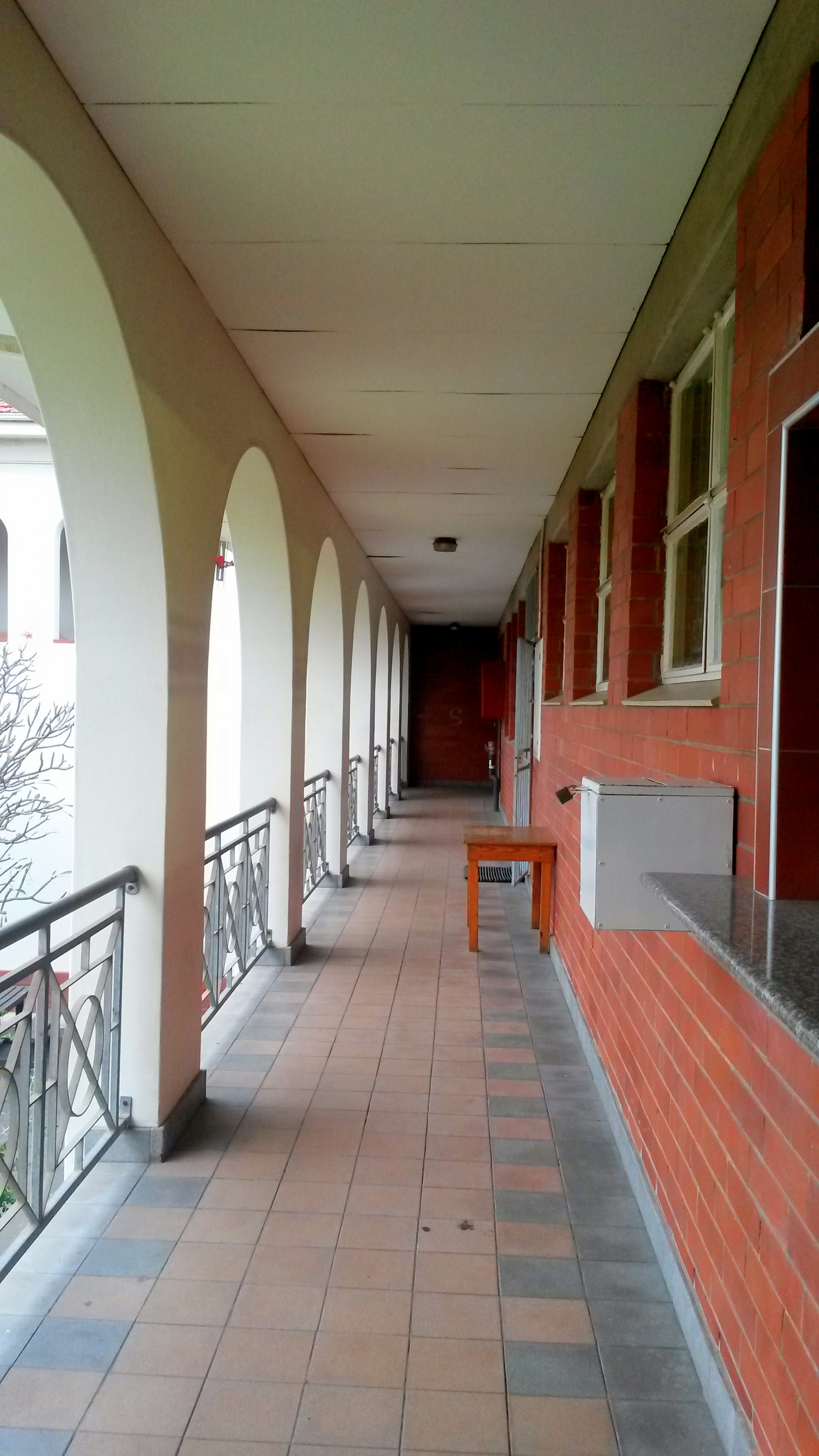
- Sastri College Main Building School Corridor

Information
- Website: sastricollege.co.za
- National heritage site
- Location within Durban
- Coordinates: 29°51′03″S 31°00′32″E
- Architect: Hermann Kallenbach

Sastri College is a co‑educational public secondary school located on the edge of Durban's central business district (Map). Originally founded in 1929 by V. S. Srinivasa Sastri, the school has played a pivotal role in increasing the number of Indian university students. Today the school now serves a diverse student body and offers an environment that balances academics, culture, and sports.

== History ==
Sastri College was named after V. S. Srinivasa Sastri, Agent General for India, who held talks in South Africa on Indian repatriation in 1926 and spearheaded fundraising for the school. The building was designed by architect Hermann Kallenbach in a popular “Berea” colonial style. The school was officially opened on 14 October 1929 by the Earl of Athlone, then Governor-General of South Africa. The double-storey main building, reflecting Colonial-era architectural aesthetics, remains central to the campus. As a protected heritage site, the structure retains much of its 1920s design integrity. The building was declared a Provincial Heritage on 17 March 1989 under the National Monuments Act.

== Role in higher education ==
In 1936, the Natal University College established a segregated campus for non-european students at Sastri, marking the first degree-level teaching for Indians and Africans in Durban. Mabel Palmer became director and served from 1945 to 1955. During this time period, a generation of students were nurtured into anti‑racialism. In 1982, the school was closed by the apartheid government and assimilated into ML Sultan Technical College as a vocational centre. It was re-opened in 1993 as a non‑racial, co‑educational high school.

== Extracurricular activities ==
The school is located close to Curries Fountain Stadium also offers annual athletics, swimming, cricket, soccer, netball, volleyball, and cross-country events. A cultural programme with Weekly religious assemblies (Christian, Muslim, Hindu) and stage productions. Students also participate in clubs such as chess, mathematics, writing, environmental and entrepreneurship. They also host career fairs, maths evenings, and exam prep sessions

== Governance and administration ==
The staff are committed to disciplined academic excellence and holistic learner development. it offers education across Grades 8–12, aiming for a minimum of Bachelors pass rates to enable university entrance. The school is governed by a School Governing Body, with an active Alumni Association that supports school initiatives and heritage preservation. The Alumni Association has actively supported Durban heritage, including restoration efforts at Resistance Park linked to passive resistance events.

== Alma mater ==
- Jerry Coovadia (1940 – 2023)
- Pravin Gordhan (1949 – 2024)
- Judge Hassan Mall
- Mahomed “Chota” Motala (1921-2005)
- Govindasamy (Govin) Reddy (1943-2017)
- Imtiaz Sooliman - Gift of the Givers
- Jayaseelen (Jay) Naidoo
- M. J. Naidoo
- M. D. Naidoo
- Judge Thumba Pillay
