= Gift of the Givers =

South African disaster response, non-governmental organisation

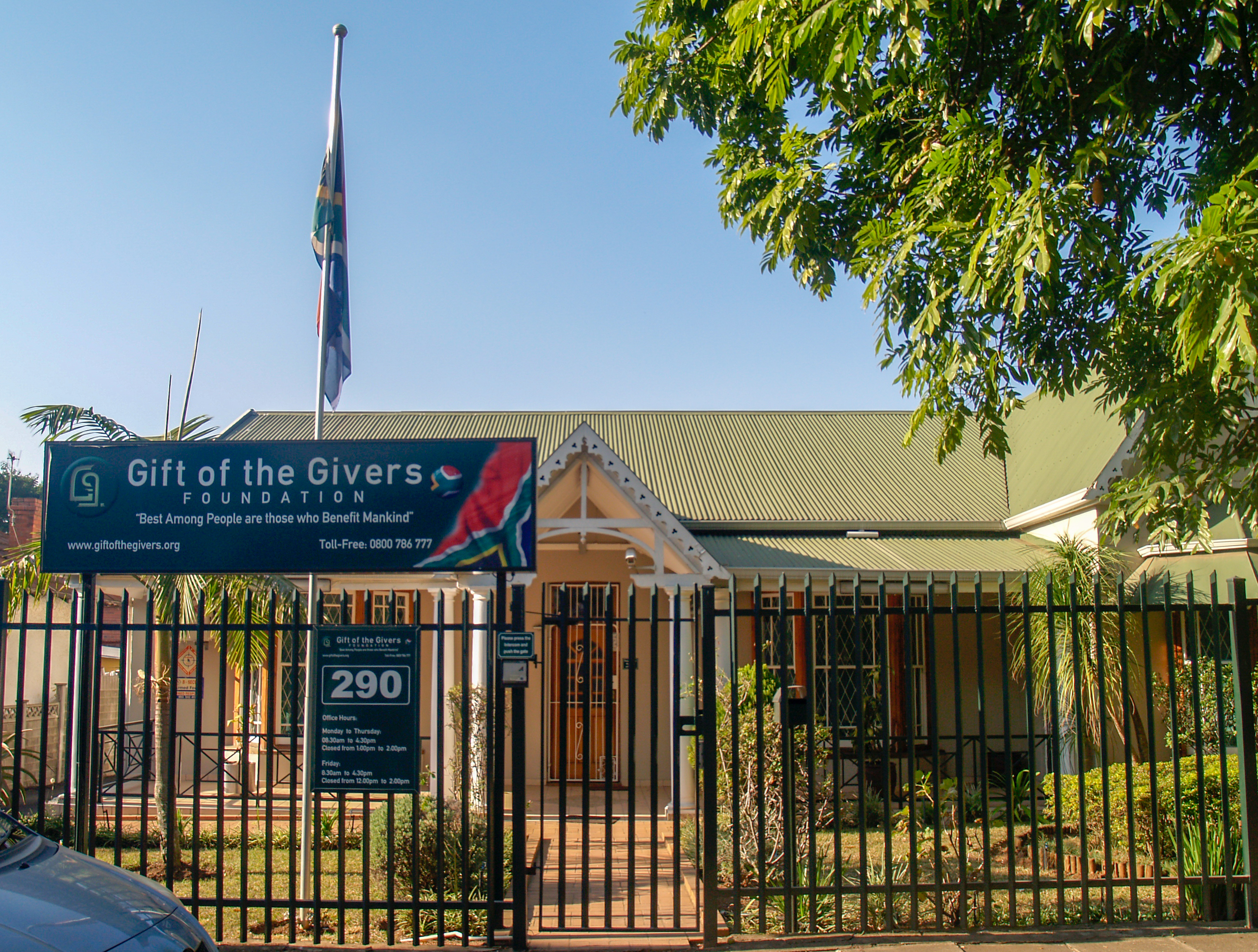
- Gift of the Givers building in Pietermaritzburg, South Africa
- Formation: 1992; 34 years ago
- Founder: Imtiaz Sooliman
- Headquarters: 290 Prince Alfred Street, Pietermaritzburg, South Africa
- Website: giftofthegivers.org

Gift of the Givers (founded as Waqful Waqifin) is a South African non-governmental organisation and disaster relief group. It was established in 1992 in Pietermaritzberg to offer worldwide disaster relief and humanitarian assistance. The organisation’s profile in South Africa grew during the 2010s and 2020s, due to challenges faced by the South African government in delivering services, including disaster relief.

As of January 2025, the organisation reported employing over 600 people with offices across nine areas including Somalia, Yemen, and Palestine. With funding from South African companies and private donations, the organisation has distributed over R6 billion ($319m) in aid across 47 countries in 32 years.

== Humanitarian efforts ==
Gift of the Givers has worked in many parts of world, including Gaza City, Bosnia, Somalia, Haiti and Zimbabwe. During the aftermath of the 2010 Haiti earthquake the organisation sent aid materials and four rescue teams to the country. In 2011, Gift of the Givers provided food aid to Somalia by airlifting 180 tons and shipping 2000 tons of aid.

Since 2002, the Gift of the Givers team has provided over R30 Million of aid to the people of Palestine in the form of food and medical supplies and establishing a childcare centre in Gaza for children impacted by poor living conditions. The head of the organisation’s Gaza operation, Ahmed Abbasi, was killed during bombardment by Israel in November 2023.

Through Gift of the Givers, South African medics and volunteers have been assisting people during the Syrian civil war. As a result of the unrest there, some South African medics and volunteers have been injured or killed.

In 2013, victims of flooding in the Karonga region of Malawi were given aid in the form of food. In 2015, after 176 died during flooding of the Shire Valley, and with thousands homeless, the organisation provided assistance to citizens in southern Malawi.

In South Africa, Gift of the Giver projects have addressed a range of natural and man-made issues. These include drilling a borehole when water was interrupted for weeks at Johannesburg-based Rahima Moosa Hospital in June 2021, drought relief for the disastrous Eastern Cape drought, and supplying enriched sheep pellets for struggling Sutherland farmers. The organisation also assisted with hunger alleviation and addressing childhood malnutrition for impoverished communities in the Eastern Cape through 50 feeding centres. They have also established science centres and drilled boreholes.

Gift of the Givers has Africa's only “LifeLocator” device used to detect survivors beneath rubble. The group's developments include a groundnut-soya high energy and protein supplement and a container mobile hospital. Developed in South Africa in 1992, this mobile medical facility was deployed in Bosnia during the Siege of Mostar.

== Founder ==
Imtiaz Sooliman SCOB
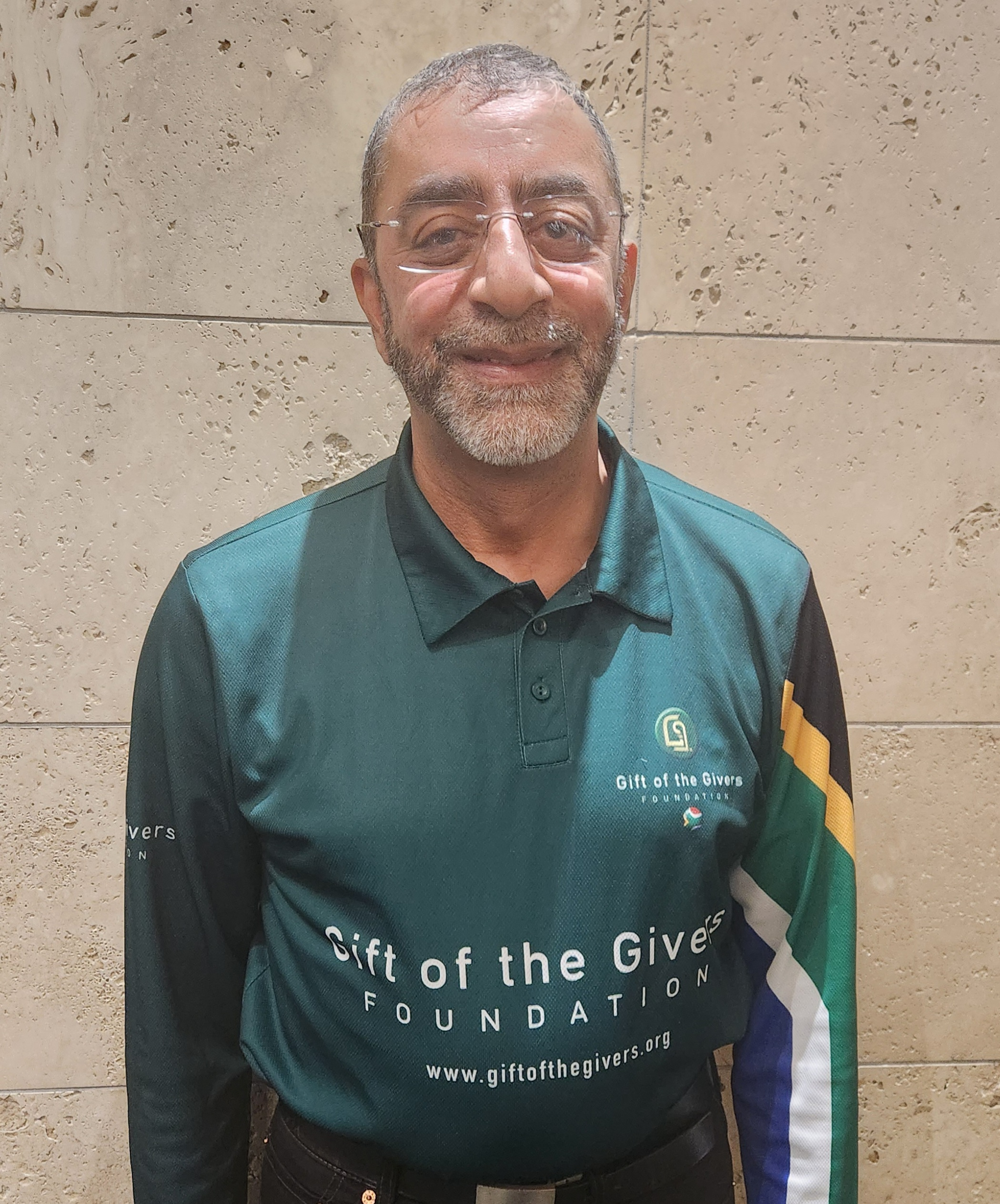

Personal details
- Born: Imtiaz Ismail Sooliman; 7 March 1962 (age 64) Potchefstroom, Transvaal
- Children: 6 (5 with first wife and 1 with second)
- Education: Sastri College
- Alma mater: University of Natal
- Occupation: Medical doctor, philanthropist
- Known for: Humanitarian work

The founder and chair of the Gift of the Givers is Imtiaz Ismail Sooliman, a South African medical doctor. Under his leadership, Gift of the Givers has been developed into the largest disaster response agency of African origin.

=== Early life and education ===
Sooliman was born on 7 March 1962 in Potchefstroom. He completed his high school education at Sastri College in Durban, Natal in 1978. He qualified as a medical doctor by obtaining his MBChB at the University of Natal. He ran a medical practise in Pietermaritzburg, Natal up to 1986.

Family

Sooliman is polygamous and has two wives. His first wife is a co-founder of Gift Of The Givers and they have 5 children together. In 2007, he married his second wife, a nurse he met on a Gift of the Givers mission, and had 1 child with her.

Career and founding of organisation

Sooliman's drive for establishing Gift of the Givers was the instruction of a Sufi sheik, Muhammed Safer Dal Effendi of the Jerrahi tariqah, which happened in Istanbul, Türkiye on 6 August 1992. The Sufi holy man also gave Sooliman the name "Waqful Waqifin" (Arabic for Gift of the Givers).

Sooliman recounts the instruction as such:

“My spiritual teacher looked me in the eye and in fluent Turkish said, ‘My son, I’m not asking you – I’m instructing you – form an organisation. The name will be Waqful Waqifin (Arabic for Gift of the Givers). It will serve all people, of all races, religions, colours, cultures, and classes, of any geographical location and of any political affiliation. You will serve them unconditionally and you will not expect anything in return. This is an instruction for you for the rest of your life’.”

In the 1994 elections Sooliman ran for political office as the head of the Africa Muslim Party. However, the party failed to win any seats and he subsequently left politics.

Sooliman has publicly commended the South African's case brought against Israel at the International Court of Justice.

Some of the projects where he has been involved include:

- 2014 hostage rescue operations in Yemen – Trying via negotiations to free Pierre Korkie, a teacher, who was held by militants from al-Qaeda in the Arabian Peninsula. Korkie died in the American rescue attempt.
- Iraq – Helping local citizens in the aftermath of the war between Iraq and forces of the US and the UK.
- Mauritania – Building a centre and nursery for women and children.
- Syria – Delivered supplies to refugees in the Idlib region where a war was on-going.
- Nepal – Rescue operations after an earthquake in April 2015.
- South Africa – Beaufort West and Fraserburg - assisting the towns with their water crisis. Rebuilt houses in Khayelitsha after the New Year fires, and distributed aid to Marikana miners' families.

=== Recognition ===
- 19 October 1993 – President's Order of the Star of South Africa from President F.W. De Klerk, which is the highest civilian award in the country.
- 25 April 1997 – Pietermaritzburg City Council Civic Commendation Award from President Nelson Mandela for Outstanding Community Service.
- 30 June 2006 – Presidential Award, Tamgha-i-Eisaar, from the President of Pakistan, Pervez Musharraf, for Pakistan Earthquake.
- 28 November 2008 – South African Medical Association Excellence in Health Care Award.
- 18 November 2009 – Recognised as one of 500 of the world's most influential Muslims in a book by Professor John Esposito of Georgetown University, USA.
- 2011 – Award from Sheikh Yusuf al Qardawi for service to Palestine.
- 1 April 2016 – Honorary Doctorate from Rhodes University, in Grahamstown, South Africa.
- 7 September 2017 – Chancellor's Medal from the University of Pretoria.
- 1 February 2018 – FW de Klerk Foundation presented him with the Goodwill Award.
- 20 March 2018 – Honorary Doctorate from the University of Stellenbosch for the establishment of the Gift of the Givers.
- 21 June 2018 – Standard Bank KwaZulu-Natal Top Business Award.
- Sep 2024 – Dr Sooliman was adopted as one of the king's sons by The Royal House of AmaXhosa in a ceremony held in Cebe in the Eastern Cape. This recognition for his work alongside traditional leaders, including during a 2021 bus crash and for feeding schoolchildren and renovating hospitals, marks the first time in a decade that such an acknowledgement has been bestowed.

== Controversies ==
=== Open letter ===
Gift of the Givers founder, Dr Sooliman was invited to give the Helen Suzman Foundation's 2024 Memorial Lecture. On 23 October 2024, an open letter was written to the foundation and published in The Times Of Israel, calling for Sooliman's invitation to be withdrawn on account of him "directly or indirectly" funding terrorism. Further, the letter called for any Helen Suzman Foundation funding to Gift of the Givers to be halted, and a forensic audit carried out.

The letter's main focus was on Dr Sooliman's as a person who is allegedly "dedicated to the destruction of the Jewish State, disrespects the rule of law and who identifies with radical Islamist ideologies". The letter appealed to the foundation on the basis of Helen Suzman's support of Israel and the foundation's stated commitment to constitutional democracy. Suzman was a non-observant Jewish South African anti-apartheid activist and politician. In the week after the letter was published, the Helen Suzman Foundation released a media statement confirming Dr Sooliman as speaker as planned.

Other highlights of the letter's content included:

- Calling Dr Sooliman an "ardent and long-time activist in support of radical Palestinian causes".
- Characterising the South African branch of the Al Aqsa Foundation which Sooliman founded as "an Islamic charity committed to Islamic rule and the destruction of the Jewish state." After leaving a year to found Gift of the Givers, the letter alleges that "Dr. Sooliman continued to donate to both the Al Aqsa Foundation and that Waqful Waqifin/Gift of the Givers donated directly to the Union of Good, which has since been designated by the US Department of Treasury as supporting terrorism (Executive Order 13224 of November 2008)."
- Calling Dr. Sooliman a "crude racist bigot using undeniably antisemitic stereotypes" with regards to his statement that “They [the Zionists] run the world with fear, control with money, and terrify you with antisemitism, well I have a message: find a new narrative, this one is dull, boring.” The letter claimed Sooliman was using the term 'Zionist' instead of 'Jew' and was antisemitic.
- Saying Dr Sooliman's sister, Quraysha Ismail Sooliman "expressed ludicrous and ugly antisemitism" in an opinion piece published in the Mail & Guardian, "contributing to a rapidly deteriorating and hostile public discourse in South Africa, an embarrassment to the University of Pretoria where she is a postdoctoral researcher in the Department of Political Sciences." The letter also highlights a conversation between the two where Quraysha Sooliman asks her brother how he as a humanitarian deals with different hierarchies of people, organisations and leaders, and why he is not silenced in being critical of Israel. Part of his response, "I don’t follow international law, or 'human' law. I follow Koranic law." was criticised as a statement against the "rule of law."
- Calling the likelihood of donations for Gaza being used "exclusively to provide humanitarian relief for innocent civilians", "remote", saying it's more likely to support Hamas "and other terror organizations".

This sparked a series of related accusations, most notably from Marika Sboros and The Kiffness

=== Response ===
Sooliman denied the charges, saying he could account for every cent received and donated as well as affirming his support for Palestinians and Gift of the Givers' support of an additional submission South African made on 28 October at the ICJ against Israel.

Dr Sooliman later made a statement thanking his critics:

"Gift of the Givers would like to thank lawyer Lawrence, Times of Israel, Feinberg and the SA Jewish Report, Alec, Marika, Biznews, and farmer Willem for the incredible escalation in our profile both locally and internationally on platforms we didn’t even know existed. This has resulted in a flood of current and new donors wanting to support our various causes. You have benefited the Palestinian cause immensely."

== See also ==
- Humanitarianism in Africa
- Attacks on humanitarian workers
- Gaza humanitarian crisis (2023–present)
