= Parsee Rustomjee =

Indian-South African philanthropist, businessman and Indian independence activist

Rustomjee Jivanji Ghorkhodu
- Born: 1861; India
- Died: 14 November 1924 (aged 62–63)
- Other names: Parsee Rustomjee, Parsi Rustomji, Kakaji
- Occupations: Businessman and philanthropist
- Known for: satyagraha

Rustomjee Jivanji Ghorkhodu (1861 – 14 November 1924), commonly known as Parsee Rustomjee, and by various orthographic variations including Parsi Rustomji and affectionately referred to as Kakaji, was an Indian-South African philanthropist and businessman, well known for his close mentorship, guidance and financial sponsorship of Mahatma Gandhi during his time in South Africa from 1893 to 1914.

Rustomjee was the largest South African contributor to the satyagraha (non-violent resistance). His various philanthropic deeds include establishing the Indian hospital in Durban; the M. K. Gandhi Library and Parsee Rustomjee Hall; Parsee Rustomjee Orphanage; M. K. Gandhi Tamil School; an orphanage connected with the mosque at Umgeni; an Indian orphanage of the Roman Catholic Church; and part of the cost of a Methodist day school. He also supported several projects of Gandhi in India. There is a primary school in Merebank, KwaZulu-Natal bearing his name.

== Early life ==
Rustomjee was born in India in 1861 to an Orthodox Parsi Zoroastrian family. His surname Ghorkhodu translates from Gujarati as 'grave-digger' indicating it was potentially the profession of an ancestor which is surprising due to Zoroastrian funerary customs which explicitly forbid burial practices. It has also been proposed that his ancestral surname Ghorkhodu is allegorical, owing to Parsi humour.

Rustomjee arrived in Durban aged seventeen. Initially he worked for an aerated water company but later became an influential businessmen and political leader.

== Later life and relations with Gandhi ==
Mohandas Karamchand Gandhi and Rustomjee soon became close associates soon after Gandhi's arrival in 1893. On August 22, 1894 he co-founded the Natal Indian Congress (NIC) as a Vice-President. Meetings of the NIC were often held at his shop on Field Street, sometimes amongst sacks of grain and bottles of pickle.

Gandhi and his young family were given shelter at Rustomjee's house on January 13, 1897, after a mob of Europeans attacked Gandhi. Rustomjee and his property were threatened by the mob but he was unrelenting in his support for Gandhi.

Alongside Shapurji Randeria, Dawad Mahomed, N. C. Anglia and others he tested his domiciliary rights in Transvaal in August 1908. He crossed into the Transvaal by rail to protest the racialist Immigration Restriction acts including the Transvaal Asiatic Registration Act. He was arrested on the 27th of August and ordered to leave the colony, but recorded the border and was sentenced to three months of hard labour.

Rustomjee described himself in the Court at Volksrust as a general merchant in Natal, where he was a considerable property owner with large business interests throughout South Africa. He also considered himself to have vested rights as a pre-war resident of the Transvaal. Unusually for a South African-Indian he was a Parliamentary voter registered in Natal. He said he initially arrived in the Transvaal in 1893 and owned three properties there which had been expropriated by the Johannesburg municipality in 1904. His financial affairs in the Transvaal had then been conducted by Gandhi. Owing to his Parsi ethnicity he was exempt from the registration certificates required by the Dutch government and he had been exempted from the necessity of taking a registration certificate under the Dutch government.

On 11 February 1909, he was sentenced to sixth months of hard labour for refusing to give his thumbprints and sentenced again on 11 August 1909, to six months of hard labour.

Gandhi visited him in prison in December 1909 and gravely reported that Rustomjee health was weakening. He walked about with an eye-shade, his sight being affected, he complained of side ache and constitutional disease. In prison Rustomjee lost over seventy lbs. Rustomjee visited Durban in February 1910 to recuperate from his illness. He was greeted by some five hundred people at Durban station and more as he returned home. At his premises on Field Street, he gave a rousing speech arguing the honour of India was threatened.

Despite his stay in Transvaal prisons, Rustomjee insisted on joining a group of resisters from the Phoenix Settlement (to which he had been a major financial benefactor). This included Kasturba Gandhi, who had started the third phase of the satyagraha on 15 September 1913. The fifteen satyagrahis crossed the border at Transvaal and were sentenced on 23 September to three months with hard labour.

Rustomjee suffered great persecution during his imprisonment at the Pietermaritzburg jail. He was deprived of his Zoroastrian girdle (kushti) and undershirt (sedreh). Rustomjee went on a hunger strike until these were restored back to his possession. He was eventually given back his girdle and undershirt after protests in both India and South Africa. Rustomjee was also moved to Durban prison where he was assaulted twice by 'native' warders.

In total he served 18 months in prison during the satyagraha, all with hard labour, at the prisons in Volksrust, Heidelberg, Diepkloof, Johannesburg, Pietermaritzburg and Durban.

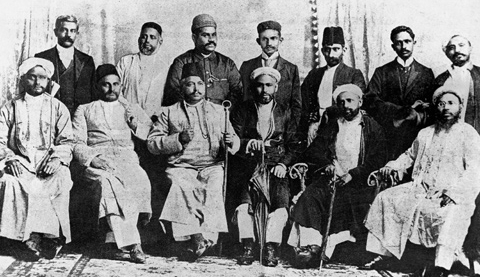
The Natal Indian Congress
