= Buyiswa Fazzie =

South African politician and activist (1931–2018)

Member of the National Assembly
- In office May 1994 – June 1999

Personal details
- Born: 7 July 1931 Grahamstown; Cape Province, South Africa
- Died: 8 September 2018 (aged 87)
- Party: African National Congress
- Spouse: Henry Fazzie (died 2011)

Buyiswa Fazzie (née Siwisa; 7 July 1931 – 8 September 2018), also known as Ethesian Fazzie, was a South African politician and former anti-apartheid activist who represented the African National Congress (ANC) in the National Assembly from 1994 to 1999. During apartheid, she was the president of the Port Elizabeth Women's Organisation, the women's wing of the Port Elizabeth Black Civic Organisation.

== Early life and activism ==
Fazzie was born on 7 July 1931 in Grahamstown in the former Cape Province. During apartheid, she was a member of the women's committee of the Port Elizabeth Black Civic Organisation (PEBCO); with Ivy Gcina, she founded the Port Elizabeth Women's Organisation as a wing of PEBCO. She was the inaugural president of PEWO from 1983 to 1991.

== Parliament: 1994–1999 ==
In South Africa's first post-apartheid elections in 1994, Fazzie was elected to represent the ANC in the National Assembly, the lower house of the new South African Parliament. She held her seat until the next general election in 1999. She later worked as a civil servant in the Department of Health.

== Personal life and death ==
She was married to Umkhonto we Sizwe activist Henry Fazzie, who was detained for long periods during apartheid and with whom she had children. She died on 8 September 2018 after a long illness.
