= Passive resistance campaign 1946-48 =

Passive resistance campaign by Indian South Africans

The passive resistance campaign was a response to laws, the Asiatic Land Tenure and Indian Representation Act, 1946, dubbed the Ghetto Act, which restricted the rights of Indian South Africans to own or occupy land and offered limited, segregated political representation.

== Background ==
Since 1890, anti-Indian sentiment in South Africa had been expressed via legislation.

== 1946 legislation ==
The Asiatic Land Tenure and Indian Representation Act (No. 28 of 1946), confirmed long-held fears among many within the South African Indian Community, that their opportunities would be restricted

The state's ongoing attempt to "peg" the ownership of land (called the Indian Question) had caused much distrust, and this "Ghetto Act" would affect Indian economic and commercial interests with its formally established segregation laws. The act also offered a limited franchise to men with educational and property qualifications

== Resistance Day ==
The act came into being on 6 June 1946 and Natal Indian Congress, declared 13 June "Resistance Day". On that day, around 25,000 protesters marched from “Red Square” to what is now the site of the Passive Resistance Park in defiance of the legislation. Led by Monty Naicker and M. D. Naidoo, protesters "occupied" a piece of land in their tents and defied the Ghetto Act.

Multiple arrests, assaults, provocations and injustices followed. With resisters meeting frequently at Red Square and continuing to occupy the Resistance Plot or Resistance Camp. Naicker, like Mahatma Gandhi, espoused a philosophy of non-violent resistance.

== Commemorations ==
The passive resistance activities were later commemorated (separately) by Nelson Mandela, Thabo Mbeki, and Manmohan Singh at Resistance Park.
