= Natal Legislative Assembly Bill =

The Natives Legislative Assembly Bill of 1894, formed part of the apartheid system of racial segregation in South Africa.

This legislation sought to deprive Indians in Natal of the parliamentary vote. The bill was opposed by Mahatma Gandhi of India, who submitted a petition signed by 10,000 Indians to the Natal government. Though they were unsuccessful in preventing the legislation from eventually being passed, the bill is believed to Gandhi's establishment of the Natal Indian Congress to protect the rights of Indians in South Africa. It created awareness of the racial discrimination towards South Africa Indians around the world.

As a consequence of legislation following this bill, the Indians living in Natal were removed of their rights to vote in the region.
