= Mabel Palmer =

British-born South African suffragist, journalist, lecturer, educator and academic

- 1901 graduation photograph
- Born: Mabel Atkinson; 22 May 1876 near Stocksfield, Northumberland, England
- Died: 16 November 1958 (aged 82); Durban
- Occupation(s): Educator and academic

Mabel Palmer (1876–1958) also known as Mabel Atkinson in her first career, was a British-born, suffragist, journalist and lecturer. After her marriage, she began a second career as a South African educator and academic, using her married name. One of her most noted accomplishments came after her retirement from teaching, when she spearheaded a movement to provide university education for non-white students. After providing free courses in her home for a decade, she became director of the segregated courses offered by the Natal University College, serving from 1945 to 1955. After her second retirement, Palmer continued publishing until her death in 1958.

== Early life ==
Mabel Atkinson was born on 22 May 1876 in Broomley, Northumberland, England to Jane (née Elliott) and John Boland Atkinson. Her father was an inspector of mines, and her mother an activist suffragette, who were progressive, believing in both women's education and employment. In 1894, Atkinson enrolled at Glasgow University soon after it was opened to women, and in 1897, joined the Fabian Society, becoming president of the university section of the group. She obtained a Master of Arts degree in 1900 with honours, earning the medal for most distinguished graduate of arts. Atkinson continued her education, conducting research at Glasgow University and the London School of Economics, before going abroad to study at Bryn Mawr College in Pennsylvania for a year. Her research, the first survey of Local Government in Scotland was published in 1904 and was an endorsement of reform.

== Career ==
=== In Britain ===
From 1904 to 1908 Atkinson lectured at Armstrong College, in Durham on the classics and philosophy. While still in Durham, she proposed opening summer schools sponsored by the Fabian Society to help spread their ideals through the countryside. The first of these, she organised in 1907 and the following year, she published in the International Journal of Ethics, The Struggle for Existence in Relations to Morals and Religion. Relocating to London in 1908, she became a tutor for the Workers' Educational Association (WEA) and lectured on economics from 1908 to 1915 at King's College for Women. She published articles in the Daily News on feminist and political themes including topics on celibacy as a prerequisite for women's employment, suffrage, the gold standard and trade unions and wrote an economics textbook with Margaret McKillop in 1911.

Serving as vice-chair of the Federated Council of Women's Suffrage Societies, Atkinson spoke often on the topic of women's voting and took part in demonstrations. In 1910, her position on suffrage thwarted an attempt to stand for the London County Council. In 1914, she published for the Fabian Society, a tract The Economic Foundations of the Women's Movement, evaluating the benefits of socialism for women's economic emancipation. She argued that barring married women from working forced them to be celibate and childless. At the outbreak of World War I Atkinson began lecturing on peace and supported creation of an organisation such as the League of Nations to act as an authority over nationalist concerns. However, her anti-war stance did not stop her new husband, Andrew Robert Barratt Palmer, an Australian journalist whom she had married on 2 July 1914 in Kensington, from joining the war effort. Atkinson continued her work on women and social concerns publishing in 1916, Life-Saving in War-Time, which evaluated infant mortality and its relationship to poverty. The study, looking at the economic realities of working-class mothers, was completed for the Infant Welfare Propaganda Committee.

=== In South Africa ===
In 1920, following her husband to Sydney, she began using the name Palmer. In the early part of 1921, the couple moved to Durban, South Africa. where Palmer began teaching at the Natal Technical College. She was tasked with teaching adult education courses through the WEA, which was affiliated with the college. Palmer and her husband separated and he returned to Australia. She also taught at the Technical High School and at the normal school, on subjects such as civics and history, and taught courses at trade unions and the YWCA on themes dealing with banking, currency, industry and the cost of living. In addition to her teaching, Palmer continued her involvement in Progressive causes, joining the League of Nations Study Circle, the National Council of Women of South Africa, the South African Association for the Advancement of Science, the South African Institute of Race Relations, various trade unions and other organisations, which allowed her to continue writing articles on socio-economic topics. In 1929, she joined the University of South Africa's senate. Palmer was involved in the development of a university in Durban and after a decade, the efforts were successful. In 1931 she began working lecturer in economic history at the new Natal University College (NUC), later known as the University of KwaZulu–Natal.

After retiring from NUC in 1936 Palmer began her noted work to found university education for Non-Whites in Natal. Initially holding classes in her home for part-time students who were working as teachers, the courses were offered free of charge because many of the students had to travel immense distances to attend. Later, she convinced university staff to hold lectures at venues like Sastri College, the first high school and normal school for Indian students living in Durban. In 1945, NUC set up a segregated section of courses for non-European student's education with Palmer as director. She supported the segregation of non-white students as a step within the colonial framework to expand education to non-elites, as during her own education, segregating women from men allowed women university education for the first time. During her tenure, the enrolment increased from 19 to 350 and while many of her students were grateful for the education, her lack of understanding of African and Indian cultures created some frictions. In 1955, Palmer retired for the second time, but continued publishing. She was one of the main collaborators of the 1956 Council of the South African Institute of Race Relations publication, The Indian as a South African. In 1957, she published The History of the Indians in Natal, one of the first works on Southeast Asians in the region.

== Death and legacy ==
Palmer died on 16 November 1958 at her home in Durban and was buried in the Stellawood Cemetery. Her papers are located in the Killie Campbell Collections in the library of the University of KwaZulu–Natal. A women's residence hall on the UKZN campus, designed by Hans Hallen is named after her, as is one of the houses at Westville Girls' High School. and Grosvenor Girls' High School

== Works ==
- "Women and the Revival of Interest in Domestic Politics" . The Case for Women's Suffrage . T.F. Unwin. 1907 – via Wikisource. edited by Brougham Villiers
- Natal's Indian Problem. Society of the Friends of Africa. 1945.
- The Indian as a South African: A Symposium. South African Institute of Race Relations. 1956.
- The History of the Indians in Natal. Greenwood Press Publishers. 1977.
- The Economic Foundations of the Women's Movement. Kraus Reprint. 1914.

== See also ==
- Edith McKay – Australian author and WWI nurse (1891-1963)
- Agnes Bennett – Australian New Zealand medical doctor (1872-1960)
- Jessie Ann Scott – New Zealand medical doctor, and prisoner of war (1883–1959)
- Olive Kelso King – Australian adventurer and WWI ambulance driver (1885–1958)
- Mary de Garis – Australian medical doctor (1881–1963)
- Elsie Inglis – Scottish doctor (1864–1917)
