= Henry Fazzie =

South African politician

Personal details
- Born: 3 January 1924; Stutterheim, Cape Province; Union of South Africa
- Died: August 2011 (aged 87); Port Alfred, Eastern Cape; South Africa
- Political party: African National Congress
- Spouse: Buyiswa Fazzie

Henry Mutile Fazzie (3 January 1924 – August 2011) was a South African politician who represented the African National Congress (ANC) in the National Assembly until 2009. He was an early member of Umkhonto we Sizwe and from 1965 was imprisoned on Robben Island for 12 years for his political activities. He was detained again in the 1980s for his continued anti-apartheid activism through the United Democratic Front and civics movement.

== Early life and anti-apartheid activism ==
Fazzie was born on 3 January 1924 in Stutterheim in the former Cape Province. He joined the African National Congress (ANC) and trade union movement in the 1950s in the early years of apartheid and in the early 1960s he went into exile abroad to join Umkhonto we Sizwe, the ANC's newly established (and newly illegal) armed wing. He received military training in Ethiopia. However, on their way back to South Africa, he and his group were captured in Southern Rhodesia and deported to South Africa for trial. Others detained alongside him later told the Truth and Reconciliation Commission that they had been tortured in detention.

On 1 April 1965, Fazzie was convicted under the Sabotage Act and sentenced to 20 years in prison, though his sentence was later reduced to 12 years on appeal. He was imprisoned on Robben Island. His father had taught him to conduct ritual circumcisions and he acted as an unofficial surgeon for young prisoners.

After his release, Fazzie was closely involved in the formation of the Port Elizabeth Black Civic Organisation (PEBCO); he ultimately served as its vice president. In the 1980s, he was a regional leader of the Cape branch of the United Democratic Front, which organised major consumer boycotts in Port Elizabeth. In 1986, after contravening a banning order which circumscribed his political activity, he was detained without trial for almost three years at St Alban's Prison. After his release he was active in the South African National Civics Organisation.

== Legislative career: 1994–2009 ==
After South Africa's first democratic elections in 1994, Fazzie represented the ANC in the new Parliament. He was not initially re-elected in 1999 but returned to the National Assembly not long into the legislative term, on 3 May 2000, to fill a casual vacancy. Though he retired after the 2004 general election, he again returned to his seat on 19 September 2007, on that occasion filling a vacancy created by the resignation of Mbulelo Goniwe; he left Parliament conclusively after the next general election in 2009.

== Personal life and death ==
He was married to Buyiswa Fazzie, with whom he had children and grandchildren. He died in mid-August 2011 in hospital in Port Alfred.
