= M K Gandhi Library =

Public library in Durban, South Africa

- 29°51′23″S 31°00′59″E
- Location: Durban, South Africa

M. K. Gandhi Library was a public library service for Indians, located in Queen Street (now Dennis Hurley Street), in Durban (Map). Established in 1921, this building was designed by German architect Johann Joachim Heinrich Lubke. The facade contains only a faint reminder of Mahatma Gandhi's influence on the city.

The Durban Corporation had inherited an existing library and placed it in the city hall, but the Indian community had been sorely neglected. The M. K Gandhi library was funded by Philanthropist Parsee Rustomjee. The first librarians collected books and periodicals that pertained to history, politics, religion and culture and the hall was also used for various political meetings. Plans have been mooted to create a connection between this Library building with the Emmanuel Cathedral and the Juma Masjid mosque
