= Ivy Gcina =

South African politician (1937–2021)

Member of the National Assembly
- In office May 1994 – May 2009
- Constituency: Eastern Cape

Personal details
- Born: 13 July 1937
- Died: 27 May 2021 (aged 83)
- Citizenship: South Africa
- Party: African National Congress

Cikizwa Ivy Gcina (13 July 1937 – 27 May 2021) was a South African politician and anti-apartheid activist who represented the African National Congress (ANC) in the National Assembly from 1994 to 2009. During apartheid, she was a prominent figure in community organising in Port Elizabeth, particularly through the United Democratic Front and the Port Elizabeth Women's Organisation, the women's wing of the Port Elizabeth Black Civic Organisation.

== Early life and activism ==
Gcina was born on 13 July 1937. She was orphaned as a child and received her primary education through a church school. She joined the ANC Youth League in the 1950s and was active in protests against the apartheid-era Bantu Education Act. After the ANC was banned by the government in 1960, Gcina remained active in anti-apartheid politics in Port Elizabeth in the Cape Province, from 1979 through the Port Elizabeth Black Civic Organisation (PEBCO). Dedicated to reviving the Federation of South African Women, she headed PEPCO's women's committee and in 1983 became the founding chairperson of the Port Elizabeth Women's Organisation, the women's wing of PEBCO. In the 1980s, she was a regional leader of the United Democratic Front, to which PEBCO affiliated.

Gcina's children were also active in the movement: all four of her sons were ultimately recruited into the ANC's armed wing, Umkhonto we Sizwe. While they were children, she had taught them about the Freedom Charter (also banned by the government) using a copy handwritten from memory by a relative. Three of her sons – Mthetheleli, Mkhululi and Mziwoxolo – died while stationed with MK, two in combat and one in an accident at a military camp. In addition, Gcina's brother was Sipho Hashe, one of the PEBCO Three who disappeared in 1985, presumably into police custody; in the 1990s, it was confirmed that he had been murdered by the police's Security Branch.

Gcina herself was detained on several occasions, including during the state of emergency of 1985 and later from June 1986 to June 1987. After her initial release in 1985, she was a witness in a class-action lawsuit against the state in which she testified to having been severely tortured in detention. Later, at the Truth and Reconciliation Commission, a Security Branch agent applied for – and was refused – amnesty for having petrol-bombed her home.

== Parliament: 1994–2009 ==
In the 1994 general election, South Africa's first under universal suffrage, Gcina was elected to represent the ANC in the National Assembly, the lower house of the new South African Parliament. She served three terms in her seat, gaining re-election in 1999 and 2004, and she represented the Eastern Cape constituency. She retired after the 2009 general election.

== Personal life and death ==
Gcina died on 27 May 2021 after a long illness. President Cyril Ramaphosa granted her a special provincial official funeral, which was held in Port Elizabeth, by then renamed Gqerberha.
