= Molly Blackburn =

South African activist

- Born: 11 November 1930; Port Elizabeth, South Africa
- Died: 28 December 1985 (aged 55)
- Occupations: anti-apartheid activist, political activist, civil rights campaigner and politician
- Known for: Black Sash
- Political party: Progressive Federal Party
- Relatives: Judy Chalmers (sister)

Molly Bellhouse Blackburn OLS (12 November 1930 – 28 December 1985) was a South African anti-apartheid activist, political activist, civil rights campaigner, and politician.

== Biography ==
Molly Bellhouse was born in Port Elizabeth, South Africa, the daughter of Elgar Bellhouse (Buller) Pagden, a one-time chairperson of the Progressive Party (PP) of Port Elizabeth who instilled liberal and progressive ideals in his daughter.

Graduating from Rhodes with a BA Degree after finishing school in 1947 with a first class matriculation, Blackburn spent time teaching in London before settling in Belgium. Seven years later however she returned to Port Elizabeth and joined the Black Sash, an activist group founded in 1955 by six women (Jean Sinclair, Elizabeth McLaren, Ruth Foley, Tertia Pybus, Jean Bosazza and Helen Newton-Thompson), but eventually she left due to what she perceived as the Sash's "inactivity".

In 1981 she started her political career by winning the Provincial Council seat of Walmer, Port Elizabeth, for the Progressive Federal Party (PFP). Di Bishop, who would become a lifelong friend and fellow activist also won a council seat that year. Di Bishop had joined the Black Sash in 1978 and Molly returned to the order in 1982 with a lot of ideas of her own.

She and Di began investigating rent restructuring and controversial police shootings. They began to be seen as "troublemakers" by the authorities. She received death threats and was arrested a few times.

On 28 December 1985, Molly and Brian Bishop (Di Bishop's husband) were killed in a car accident between Oudshoorn and Port Elizabeth. Di Bishop and Molly's sister, Judy Chalmers, were injured. She was 55 years old and Brian Bishop was 51 years old.

At her funeral which was held at St John's Church in Port Elizabeth on 1 January 1986, a crowd of 20,000 mostly black South Africans gathered to mourn her loss. Blackburn was survived by her husband and their seven children.

== Legacy ==
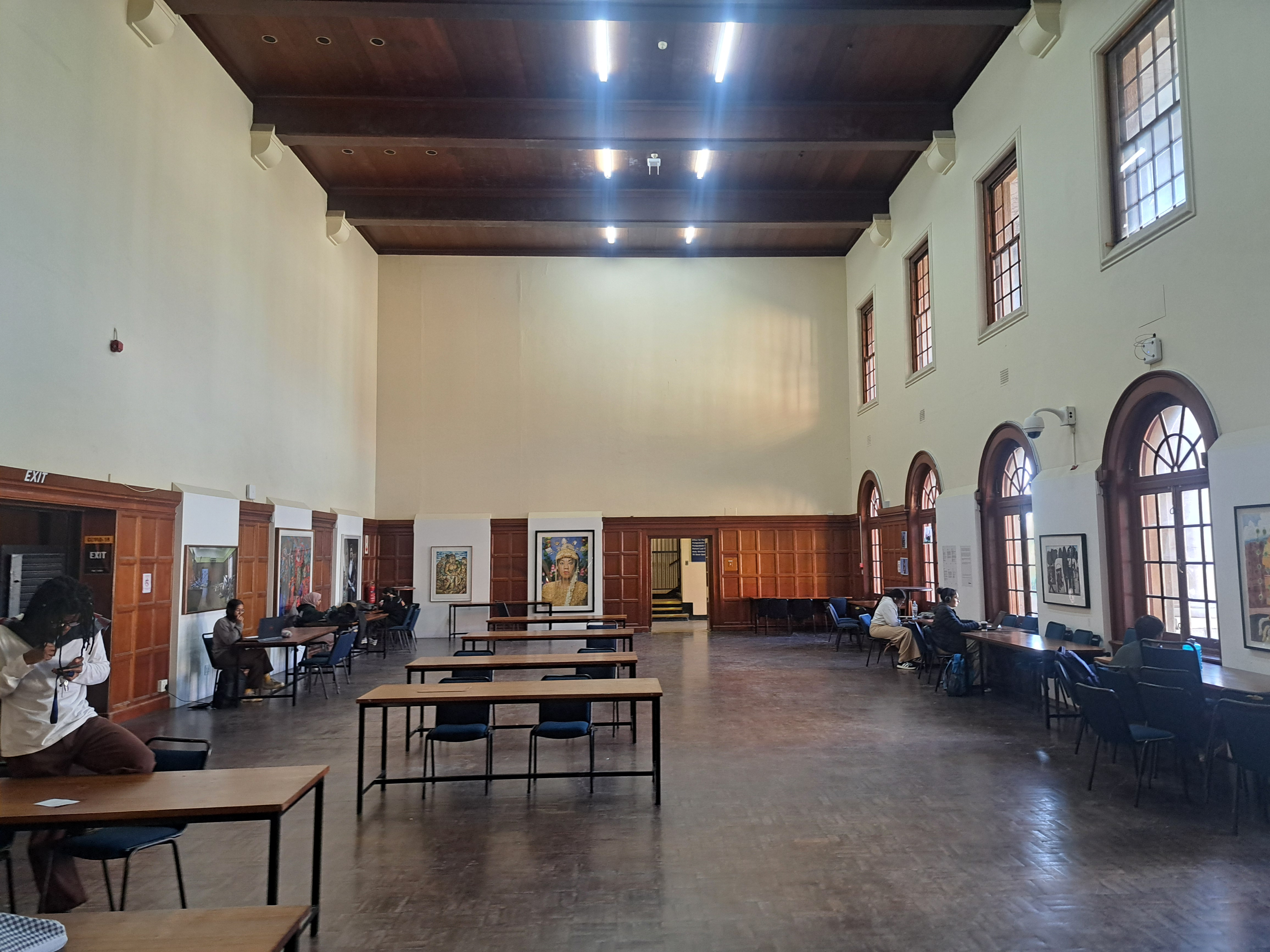
Molly Blackburn Memorial Hall, University of Cape Town

The Molly Blackburn High School was named in her honour in KwaNobuhle, as well as the Molly Blackburn Memorial Hall at the University of Cape Town.
