= M. D. Naidoo =

South African activist (1919–1995)

- Born: Mooroogiah Dhanapathy Naidoo; 1919; Durban, Natal Province; Union of South Africa
- Died: 1 June 1995 (aged 75); Durban, South Africa
- Education: University of Natal
- Known for: Anti-apartheid activism
- Spouse: Phyllis Naidoo (m. 1958; div. 1977)
- Relatives: M. J. Naidoo (brother); Mac Maharaj (brother-in-law)

Mooroogiah Dhanapathy Naidoo (1919 – 1 June 1995) was a South African Indian political activist and lawyer. He is best known for his role in the anti-apartheid movement, for which he was imprisoned on Robben Island between 1967 and 1972.

== Life and career ==
Naidoo was born in 1919 in Durban to a Hindu family descended from indentured Indian laborers. His father, a merchant, lost his property in the 1929 stock market crash, and Naidoo's secondary schooling was delayed as he left school to find work. In 1943 he enrolled at the University of Natal.

The president of the students' union at his university, he became politically active in leftist and Indian organizations; he was particularly active in the Non-European United Front, the South African Communist Party, and the Natal Indian Congress. He was imprisoned for six months in 1946 for his participation in the South African Indian Congress's campaign of passive resistance against the Ghetto Act, and during this period he also represented the Congress at the United Nations. After 1948, Naidoo's political activity extended to the anti-apartheid movement.

Meanwhile, in 1957, Naidoo was admitted to the bar in Durban, where he practiced as a lawyer. However, after several years of persecution by the apartheid government, Naidoo was arrested in 1966 and charged with violating the Suppression of Communism Act; he was convicted and sentenced to five years' imprisonment, which he served on Robben Island between 1967 and 1972. Upon his arrival on Robben Island, he was immediately co-opted onto the African National Congress High Command – the political prisoners' informal leadership organ, led by Nelson Mandela – because of his seniority in the Congress movement. After his release, Naidoo faced house arrest, a banning order and surveillance and could not practice law.

In 1977. M.J. Naidoo (M.D. Naidoo's brother) assisted him to escape into exile and enter UK illegally. Between 1977 and 1991, Naidoo lived in exile in Britain. Upon his return in 1991 he resumed his law practice. Ill with emphysema, he died on 1 June 1995 in Durban, aged 75.

== Personal life ==
In 1958 he married Phyllis Naidoo, whom he had met in the Natal Indian Congress. She had an extramarital affair during his imprisonment, and they divorced in 1977. He had custody over their two sons, Sadhan and Sha, who predeceased him; they also had a daughter together, named Sukthie.

Naidoo's brother, M. J. Naidoo, was also a prominent activist, and his sister Tim Naidoo married Mac Maharaj in 1958.
