= University of Natal =

University in South Africa (1910–2004)

Coordinates: 29.868038°S 30.980501°E

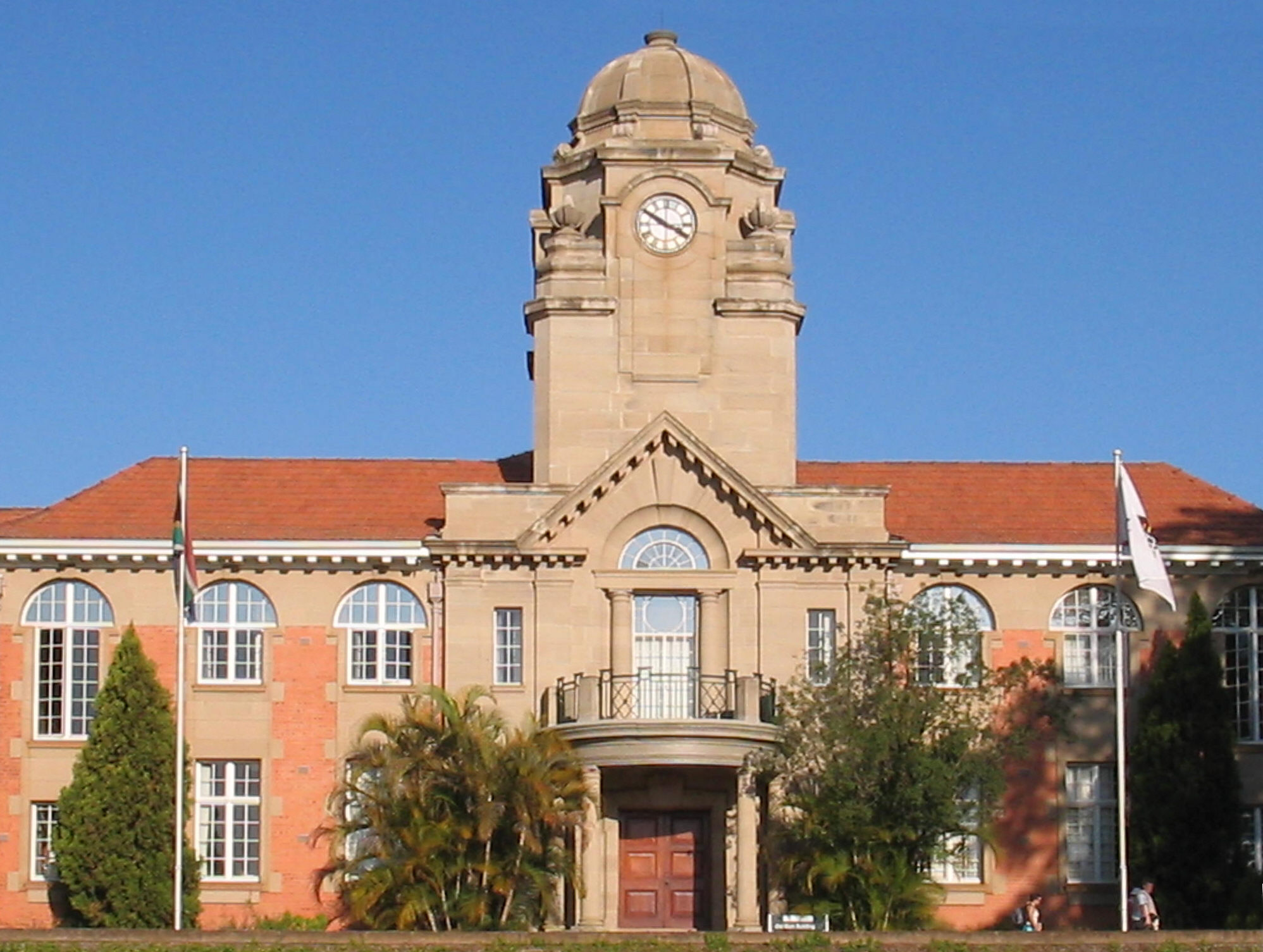
- The main clock tower of Old Main Building, located on the Pietermaritzburg campus
- Former name: Natal University College (1910–1949)
- Motto: Stella Aurorae
- Motto in English: Star of the morning
- Type: Public
- Active: 1949–2004
- Location: Durban & Pietermaritzburg, KwaZulu Natal, South Africa
- Current status: On 1 January 2004 the University of Natal as a distinct legal entity ceased to exist. It was incorporated on the above date into a new legal entity which is called the University of KwaZulu-Natal. The University of Natal was regulated by the University of Natal Act 7 of 1960.
- Colours: Black, blue, green
- Website: nu.ac.za

The University of Natal was a university in the former South African province Natal which later became KwaZulu-Natal. The University of Natal no longer exists as a distinct legal entity, as it was incorporated into the University of KwaZulu-Natal on 1 January 2004. It was founded in 1910 as the Natal University College in Pietermaritzburg and expanded to include a campus in Durban in 1931. In 1947, the university opened a medical school for non-white students in Durban. The Pietermaritzburg campus was known for its agricultural engineering programmes, hence the nickname "the farmers" whilst the Durban campus was known as "the engineers," as it concentrated on other engineering programmes.

On 1 January 2004, the University of Natal was merged with the University of Durban-Westville to create a new legal entity called the University of KwaZulu-Natal, as part of a broader reorganisation of South African universities.

== History ==
=== Non-European Section of Natal University College ===
University College of Natal (later the University of Natal) began to offer a separate university level education to "non-european" students in the ‘Non-European Section’ (NES) from 1936. Prior to this, the Fort Hare University (UFH) had been a place of political energy and resistance. Staff and students both lived and thought through non-racialism on campus. and Indian students either enrolled at Fort Hare or studied abroad at medical school. The establishment of the non-european section at Satri College extended higher education opportunities to a wider range of black South Africans and served as a model for the future apartheid state. In 1948, Natal University College was incorporated into the University of Natal but the non-european section at Satri College and the “non-European” section of the university’s medical school continued. The University of Natal had institutionalized geographically and racially separated groups of students, 12 years prior to the formal adoption of Apartheid.

=== Events ===
Under apartheid, the Howard College Campus, in Durban, was known for the activism of its staff and students against government-imposed racial segregation. Particularly in the 1960s Natal University students were active in the non-racial National Union of South African Students, which was one of the main organizations opposing the apartheid system. In the 1970s and 1980s many of its students were members of the often-banned South African Students' Organisation (SASO), centred on the main arts centre at the Howard College campus. In addition, the university magazine Dome (named for the dome of the Howard College Building), was active against apartheid and was often banned, with the printing press being moved around to prevent its being confiscated by police.

=== Campus Facilities ===
The main science block on the Howard College campus, completed in the early 1980s, was a pivotal location for biological research and game conservation for the province. The Howard College campus in Durban was strung out along the Berea, a ridge to the north of the Durban city centre.

The Howard College campus had a number of onsite residences, named after prominent South Africans including John Bews, Ernest Jansen, Louis Botha and Mabel Palmer.

The Pietermartizburg campus was the original campus, though it later became the smaller of the two main campuses. The campus is in a suburban location, centred on the library and administration buildings. The library houses many historic books, including books on colonial history and Boer war history. Unlike the Durban campus, most students did not live in campus residences.

The Pietermaritzburg campus houses the Alan Paton Centre & Struggle Archives. Formerly called the Alan Paton Centre for the Study of the Literature and Politics of Inter-group Conciliation, this centre was opened on 24 April 1989 by Professor Colin Webb.

== Former leaders ==
=== Principal ===
- Owen P.F. Horwood
- -1977 Francis E. Stock
- 1977-1984 N. Desmond Clarence
- 1984-1991 Peter de V. Booysen

=== Vice-principal, Pietermaritzburg campus ===
- 1976-1988 Deneys Schreiner
- 1988-1992 Colin Webb

=== Vice-principal, Durban campus ===
- -1977 N. Desmond Clarence
- 1977-1984 Peter de V. Booysen
- 1992- Christopher F. Cresswell

=== Post-2002 ===
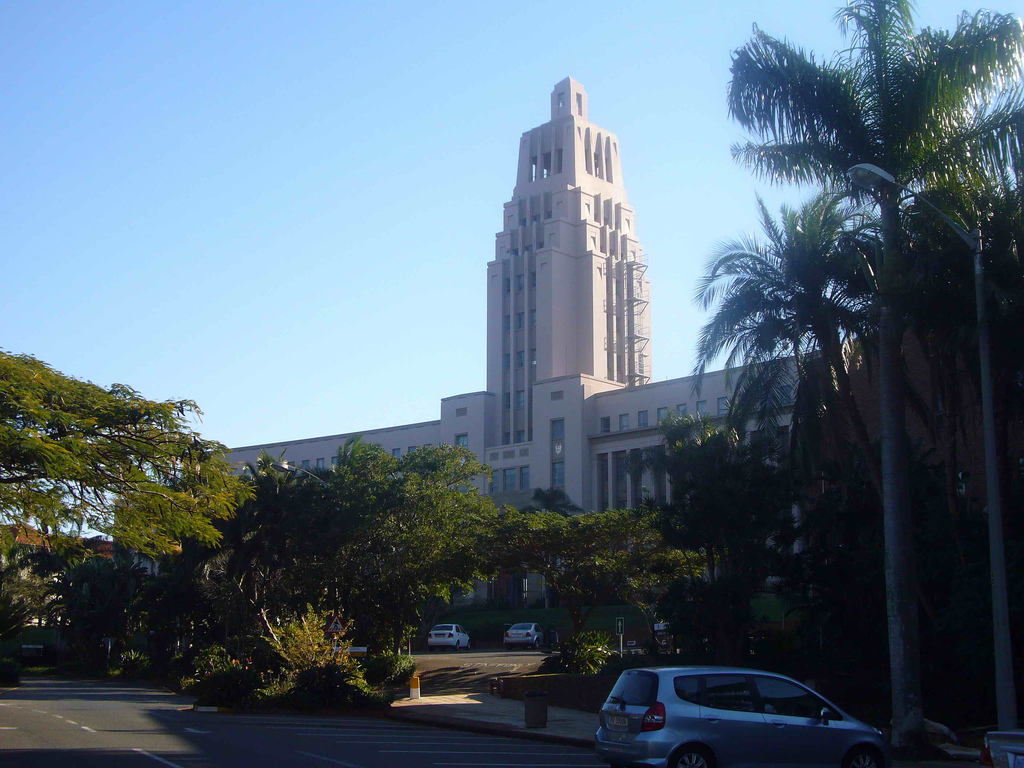
The Memorial Tower Building on the Howard College Campus of the University of KwaZulu-Natal, Durban

The Council of the University of Natal voted on 31 May 2002 to offer the post of Vice-Chancellor and University Principal to world-renowned medical scientist and former Medical Research Council President - Professor Malegapuru Makgoba who assumed office on the 1 September 2002. He was entrusted with leading the University of Natal into the merger with the University of Durban-Westville. In so doing, he became the last Vice-Chancellor of the University of Natal. Professor Makgoba succeeded Professor Brenda Gourley as Vice-Chancellor.

Brenda Gourley, a qualified chartered accountant, was the second last vice-chancellor of the University of Natal. Her appointment at the university in 1994 was an historical event in South Africa. She was the first woman in South Africa to be appointed as a vice-chancellor of a South African university.

The Maritime law programme based at the then Institute of Maritime Law at the University of Natal, which was pioneered under the headship of Professor Hilton Staniland, was one of the first Maritime law programmes of its kind in South Africa. The above institute was well known in South African Maritime circles. A number of South African statutes regulating the South African maritime industry were drafted by Professor Hilton Staniland at the above Institute, including the Carriage of Goods by Sea Act 1 of 1986 and the Wreck and Salvage Act 94 of 1996.

== Alumni ==
- Massabalala Yengwa – lawyer, anti-apartheid activist and the Natal Provincial Secretary of the African National Congress Youth League (ANCYL).
- M. J. Naidoo – South African Lawyer and NIC President
- Navi Pillay - First South African women judge of Indian origin to receive noble peace prize.
