= Judy Chalmers =

South African politician

Member of the National Assembly
- In office May 1994 – May 2009

Personal details
- Born: 16 November 1932 (age 93) Port Elizabeth, Cape Province; Union of South Africa
- Citizenship: South Africa
- Party: African National Congress
- Other political affiliations: Black Sash
- Relations: Molly Blackburn (sister); Edgar Bellhouse (father)

Judy Chalmers (née Bellhouse; born 16 November 1932) is a South African retired politician and activist who represented the African National Congress (ANC) in the National Assembly from 1994 to 2009. During apartheid, she was the chairperson of the Black Sash in the Eastern Cape.

== Early life and activism ==
Chalmers was born on 16 November 1932 in Port Elizabeth in the former Cape Province. Her father was Edgar Bellhouse, a founding member and former chair of the liberal (white) Progressive Party, and her elder sister was renowned activist Molly Blackburn. She was educated in Port Elizabeth and briefly attended college in England. As apartheid intensified, Chalmers and Blackburn grew disenchanted with traditional white politics, particularly after they attended the funeral of Robert Sobukwe in Graaff-Reinet in 1978.

By the early 1980s, Chalmers had joined the Black Sash; she became its chairperson in the Eastern Cape. During this period, with Blackburn and others, she reopened the Black Sash's Port Elizabeth Advice Office, through which she conducted outreach with black residents of the region and monitored human rights abuses by the apartheid government. The office was often subject to vandalism and was ultimately set alight.

In late December 1985, Chalmers and Blackburn were in a car accident while driving back to Port Elizabeth from Oudtshoorn with fellow Black Sash activist Diana Bishop. Chalmers and Bishop were injured, but Blackburn and Bishop's husband, Brian, were killed.

== Parliament: 1994–2009 ==
In South Africa's first post-apartheid elections in 1994, Chalmers was elected to represent the ANC in the National Assembly. She served three terms, gaining re-election in 1999 and 2004, and she represented the Eastern Cape constituency.

== Personal life ==
Chalmers is married and has three daughters and several grandchildren. After leaving Parliament, she retired to Summerstrand in Port Elizabeth.
