= Sifiso Nkabinde =

South African politician (1961–1999)

Member of KwaZulu-Natal Provincial Legislature
- In office 1994–1997

Personal details
- Born: Bhekumusi Gabriel Nkabinde; 24 June 1961 Richmond, Natal; Republic of South Africa
- Died: 23 January 1999 (aged 37) Richmond, Natal
- Party: United Democratic Movement (from 1997); African National Congress (until April 1997)
- Spouse: Nonhlanhla Nkabinde

Bhekumusi Gabriel "Sifiso" Nkabinde (24 June 1961 – 23 January 1999) was a South African politician and alleged warlord in the KwaZulu-Natal Midlands. He represented the African National Congress (ANC) in the KwaZulu-Natal Provincial Legislature from 1994 until 1997.

Nkabinde gained notoriety in the early 1990s for establishing an active self-defence unit in Richmond, Natal. He was expelled from the ANC in April 1997 for his alleged role in fomenting political violence, as well as on suspicion of having been an informant for the apartheid regime. He subsequently joined the opposition United Democratic Movement (UDM) and was the party's national secretary-general until his assassination in January 1999.

== Early life and career ==
Nkabinde was born on 24 June 1961 in Richmond in the former Natal province. His father was a policeman and later became the chairman of the local branch of Inkatha. He matriculated in 1977 and subsequently trained as a teacher at Ndaleni Teachers Training College. After leaving teaching college in 1981, he became increasingly involved in youth politics in the Natal Midlands. He joined the United Democratic Front in 1989 and when the apartheid government unbanned the African National Congress (ANC) the following year, he was elected chairman of the ANC's Richmond branch.

Shortly afterwards, he became deputy secretary of the ANC's Natal Midlands branch, serving under chairman Harry Gwala, whom the Mail & Guardian described as his mentor. Nkabinde was notorious for his involvement in organising and arming self-defence units, informal paramilitary bodies that were frequently involved in murderous clashes between ANC and Inkatha members during the political violence of the 1990s. Nkabinde established a self-defence unit in Richmond which the Truth and Reconciliation Commission later found was one of the largest in the country; in addition to being powerful in the Midlands, it garnered support and carried out operations elsewhere in Natal. The Mail & Guardian said that the core of the unit was Nkabinde's own bodyguards, trained in the use of AK-47s and explosives, and said that Nkabinde "used this personal army to take total control of Richmond by 1992".

== Provincial legislator: 1994–1997 ==
In South Africa's first post-apartheid elections in 1994, Nkabinde was elected to represent the ANC in the KwaZulu-Natal Provincial Legislature. In addition, from 1994 to 1996, he served as Deputy Provincial Secretary of the ANC's new KwaZulu-Natal branch; he served under Provincial Secretary Senzo Mchunu and Provincial Chairperson Jacob Zuma. Upon the conclusion of his term in the party office, he stood for election as Provincial Secretary, apparently disregarding an instruction from the ANC National Executive Committee to withdraw from the race. According to the Mail & Guardian, the party leadership was concerned about Nkabinde's "'warlord' reputation". At the party's provincial elective conference in December 1996, Nkabinde lost the election to the leadership's favoured candidate, Sipho Gcabashe, but was elected as an ordinary member of the ANC's Provincial Executive Committee; by number of votes received, he ranked sixth of the 13 elected candidates.

On 7 April 1997, the ANC announced that it had expelled Nkabinde from the party; it said that he had fomented violence between ANC and Inkatha members in KwaZulu-Natal and additionally that he was suspected of having been a spy for the apartheid regime. Nkabinde denied the allegations, arguing that his political popularity was perceived as threatening to ANC leaders and that he was being punished for having contested the Provincial Secretary election. However, after his death, the Truth and Reconciliation Commission found that:

Substantial evidence placed before the Commission points to the fact that Mr Sifiso Nkabinde... was recruited by the SAP [South African Police] Security Branch in 1988 as a registered source. He was recruited by Captain J T Pieterse and his task was to monitor political activists and inform the police about the movements of Umkhonto we Sizwe cadres. His previous handler, prior to his exposure as a Security Branch informer and subsequent expulsion from the ANC in 1997, had been security policeman Shane Morris. An extract from a Security Branch file on source SR 4252 outlines information obtained from Bhekumusi Gabriel Nkabinde, which is Nkabinde’s full name. The source is registered under the name of Derrick Nene.

== UDM and assassination: 1997–1999 ==
After his expulsion from the ANC, Nkabinde joined the opposition United Democratic Movement (UDM), becoming the party's national secretary-general and provincial chairperson in KwaZulu-Natal. The Guardian said that his new political affiliation was "accompanied by an upsurge in killings in Richmond as he attempted to wrest control of the area from the ANC".

In September 1997, he was arrested at his home in Magoda and trialled in the Pietermaritzburg High Court for his alleged involvement in 18 separate murders, eight preceding his expulsion from the ANC and the other ten afterwards. He faced 16 murder charges and two charges of incitement to murder. The Guardian said that several witnesses refused to testify. On 30 April 1998, he was acquitted for technical reasons: the judge was scathing about the conduct of police and prosecutors, finding that they had illegally recorded conversations between Nkabinde and his attorney and appeared to have schooled their witnesses.

On 23 January 1999, Nkabinde was assassinated while leaving a shop in Richmond. He was shot 23 times by four gunmen, who apparently carried weapons stolen from the Pietermaritzburg police station. The murder heightened tensions in Richmond and was followed by several assaults on ANC supporters, viewed as retaliatory attacks. In October 2000, four people were convicted of planning and carrying out the murder, among them a local ANC councillor named Joel Mkhize.

== Personal life ==
He was married to Nonhlanhla Nkabinde, who represented the UDM in Parliament after his death. They had three children.
