= Curries Fountain =

- Interactive map of Curries Fountain
- Coordinates: 29°50′58″S 31°00′30″E

Construction
- Opened: 1925

Curries Fountain Sport Ground is the name of a notable sports facility that was established for the Durban Indian community in 1925. This sports facility was more than just a soccer pitch, cricket grounds, cinder track and tennis court. It was also a struggle site and heritage location and has been called the "grand old lady" of this small precinct because of its connection to activism and resistance, water supply, sports and culture

== History ==
Curries was named after the Mayor and Councillor HW Currie, who sank a well and pumps below the Botanic Gardens (Map). This facility delivered 50,000 gallons of water a day to the town. Today the area is a popular stadium and a memorial fountain commemorates the mayor.

This damp patch of turf was used as a venue for mass open-air meetings, which began in 1913 with the Durban Strikes. Negotiations to lease the land as a sports venue began in 1920 and the Durban Indian Sports Ground Association (DISGA) was granted a 25-year lease in 1925.

In 1946, the Natal Inter-Race Soccer Board (NISB) was established, comprising three football associations.

- Indian Football Association (NIFA),
- Natal African Football Association (NAFA), and
- Natal Coloured Football Association (NCFA).

From 1946 - 1960, matches were played along racial lines with Albert Luthuli was one of the key promoters of this soccer board. Luthuli's interest in soccer was political and the ANC saw the game as a means to create alliances between Durban's mostly urban workers, rural migrants, and mission-educated elites. These alliances were developed further with industrialisation and urbanisation. Inter race football was seen, at that time, as a positive development. Soccer games broke race barriers. However, these race-based matches also exacerbated race consciousness. On 31 July, a soccer match at Curries Fountain, between the South African Indian XI and the South African Africans XI at Curries Fountain, Durban resulted in riots. The Curries Fountain incident changed opinions about inter-race matches and the eventual outcome would be a commitment (among the majority) to non-racial football in South Africa.

== Soccer at Curries Park ==
The sports ground has 100 years of sporting history, and the Federation Professional League (FPL) was established. With the implementation of the Group Areas Act in the 1960s, the tensions created by racial sporting codes, sports federations' activities were interrupted, after 1960, Curries Fountain became an important venue for non-racial sporting codes, and teams that played at the venue included:

- Aces United
- Avalon Athletics
- Berea, Sundowns
- Orlando Pirates
- Moroko Swallows
- Bush Bucks
- Zulu Royals
- Transvaal United
- Verulam Suburbs

The FPL league also promoted integration by secretly registering Black African players.

Today the Curries Fountain Sports Development Centre manages the venue, and plans have been made to use the facility as a model for other townships and rural areas to follow and create integrated and community managed sport facilities.

== Recent Events ==
Notable events at Curries Fountain
Date	Event	Press report
5 May 2024	130th NIC Anniversary	Natal Witness

SPORTS LEGEND
Result	Colour
Won	W
Lost	L
Draw	D
