= Nonhlanhla Nkabinde =

South African politician

Member of the National Assembly
- In office 23 April 2004 – May 2009

Personal details
- Citizenship: South Africa
- Party: United Democratic Movement
- Spouse: Sifiso Nkabinde (d. 1999)

Nonhlanhla Claribel Nkabinde is a South African politician who represented the United Democratic Movement (UDM) in the National Assembly from 2004 to 2009. She was elected to her seat in the 2004 general election.

Nkabinde is the widow of Sifiso Nkabinde, a controversial politician in the Natal Midlands who joined the UDM after being expelled from the African National Congress (ANC). He was assassinated in Richmond, Kwa-Zulu-Natal in January 1999 and a local ANC politician was convicted of involvement in the murder. Nkabinde herself entered politics the following year, when the UDM announced that she would stand for election as a local councillor in Richmond in the 2000 local elections.
