= Lakhani Chambers =

Lakhani Chambers in Durban was an important headquarter for anti-apartheid activists.

Lakhani Chambers in Durban was the headquarters of the Natal Indian Congress, the African National Congress the South African Communist Party and the Congress Youth League. Today it can be found at the corner of Saville and Yusuf Dadoo Streets. Here, under the leadership of Monty Naiker the Natal Indian Congress (NIC) would focus its attention on social welfare The Chamber were an opportunity for political-education and it was here, in 1960, that Jabob Zuma spent three years learning about trade unionism and its application in the South African Congress of Trade Unions (SACTU)
