= Natal Indian Congress =

Civil rights organisation for Indians in South Africa (1894–1994)

- Founder: Mahatma Gandhi
- Founded: 22 August 1894
- Ideology: Gandhism; Indian minority interests Nonviolent resistance Socialism; Anti-Apartheid; Anti-colonialism; Liberalism
- Political position: Left-wing
- Religion: Hinduism, Islam
- National affiliation: South African Indian Congress

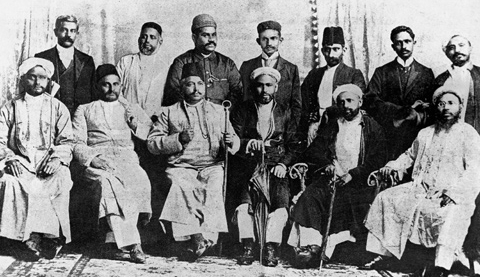
Founders of the Natal Indian Congress in 1895; Gandhi is in the top row, fourth from left.

The Natal Indian Congress (NIC) was a political organisation established in 1894 to fight discrimination against Indian South Africans in the Natal Colony, and later the Natal Province, of South Africa. Founded by Mahatma Gandhi, it later served an important role in opposing apartheid. It was the oldest affiliate of the South African Indian Congress.

During its formative years, the constituency of the NIC largely comprised educated Indian merchants who sought to oppose discriminatory legislation through petitioning. In the mid-1940s, the organisation became increasing confrontational under the leadership of Monty Naicker, who led the NIC through a renowned campaign of passive resistance against the Asiatic Land Tenure and Indian Representation Act from 1946 to 1948. After the introduction of formal apartheid in 1948, the NIC participated in the Defiance Campaign, the beginning of a long, though not untroubled, alliance with the African National Congress (ANC).

In the 1960s, members of the NIC and other Congress Alliance organisations faced increased state repression, and the organisation entered a decade of dormancy. It was revived in October 1971 and continued its activism against apartheid, notably through boycotts of the South African Indian Council and Tricameral Parliament. The NIC was a founding affiliate of the United Democratic Front, whose leadership often overlapped with that of the NIC. Although the NIC was represented at the Convention for a Democratic South Africa in 1991, it did not restructure itself as a political party during South Africa's democratic transition. Instead, many leaders and members joined the ANC, and the NIC again fell into dormancy from around the time of the first post-apartheid elections in 1994.

== Early years: 1894–1948 ==
=== Origins ===
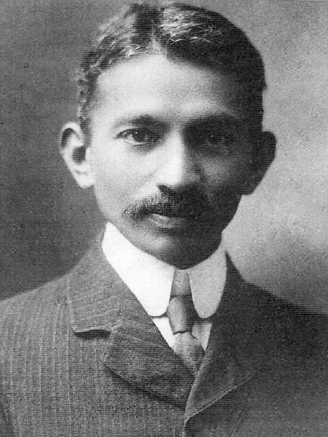
Mahatma Gandhi in South Africa in 1909

The Natal Indian Congress (NIC) emanated from a proposal by Mahatma Gandhi on 22 May 1894 and was formally established on 22 August 1894. Abdoola Hajee Adam Jhaveri (Dada Abdulla) was the inaugural president and Gandhi was appointed honorary secretary. The organisation's early membership was restricted to the educated class of South African Indian traders who could afford the £3 membership fee, and its primary early concern was to protect the economic and politician position of Indian merchants and property-owners, generally through petitions and other extra-parliamentary protests. Critics also said that the NIC under Gandhi's leadership was highly adverse to cooperation with other racial groups, though it affiliated with similar Indian organisations in the other provinces in the early 1920s, when an umbrella body, the South African Indian Congress (SAIC), was established.

=== Shift to the left ===
In the 1930s, dissatisfaction among young professionals and trade unionists led to the emergence of a rival and more progressive political organisation, the Natal Indian Association (NIA). Within the NIA was a loosely constituted "Nationalist Bloc", influenced directly or indirectly by the ideology of socialism and racial liberation, who advocated a more radical and militant politics, set off against the prevailing "accommodationist" politics of the NIC. When the NIA merged into the NIC in 1943, this bloc formed a pressure group, the Anti-Segregation Council, led by Monty Naicker. At the NIC's annual elective conference on 21 October 1945, this faction succeeded in ousting the NIC's moderate leadership (then under A. I. Kajee and P. R. Pather) and installed Naicker as president of the NIC. Others associated with Naicker's coup were Doctor Goonam, I. C. Meer, George Ponnen, H. A. Naidoo, and Marimuthu Pragalathan Naicker.

=== Ghetto Act ===
Under this more confrontational leadership, but still in line with Gandhi's programme of satyagraha, the SAIC led a major campaign of passive resistance to the Asiatic Land Tenure and Indian Representation Act, which it disparaged as the Ghetto Act; the campaign was naturally spearheaded by the NIC in Natal. It began on 13 June 1946 and continued for two years, during which time almost 2,000 related arrests were made. Also during this period, the NIC made unprecedented advances towards inter-racial cooperation, together with the Transvaal Indian Congress (TIC), where Naicker's counterpart was Yusuf Dadoo. In March 1947, Dadoo and Naicker signed a tripartite cooperation agreement with Alfred Xuma, the president of the African National Congress (ANC); nicknamed the "Doctors' Pact" (because all three signatories were doctors), the document promised "the fullest co-operation between the African and Indian peoples".

== Early opposition to apartheid: 1948–1960 ==
Early inter-racial cooperation was, however, fitful, and there remained racial tensions and even occasional violence between blacks and Indians in Natal. However, the NIC did participate in early joint action against the system of apartheid introduced by the National Party government elected in 1948. Through the SAIC, and alongside the ANC and Coloured Franchise Action Council, the NIC participated in the 1952 Defiance Campaign, which is generally thought to have been inspired by the earlier campaign against the Ghetto Act. The NIC's offices were raided alongside those of the ANC, and NIC leaders submitted for arrest.

At the ANC's conference in November 1952, James Njongwe, the president of the Natal ANC, told the party that the "greatest achievement of our Defiance Campaign has been the welding of a... singleness of purpose and the development of a common South African outlook between Indians and [black] Africans". The SAIC was a signatory of the Freedom Charter at the 1955 Congress of the People and several NIC leaders, such as Naicker and Billy Nair, were among the defendants in the resulting Treason Trial.

== Dormancy: 1960–1971 ==
After the 1960 Sharpeville massacre, the apartheid government embarked upon a major campaign to repress political opposition, banning the ANC and effecting mass arrests around the country. Though the NIC was not itself banned, its members were severely restricted: some, such as Billy Nair and Ebrahim Ebrahim, were imprisoned due to their dual membership of Umkhonto we Sizwe; others, such as M. P. Naicker, H. A. Naidoo and George Ponnen, were dual members of the South African Communist Party (SACP) and went into exile with the party; while others, such as Monty Naicker, Dawood Seedat, J. N. Singh and I. C. Meer, were subject to prolonged banning orders under the Suppression of Communism Act. In addition, the implementation of forced removals of Indians under the Group Areas Act severely disrupted patterns of civic and political mobilisation.

The NIC entered a decade of dormancy. Mewa Ramgobin later described the organisation as having been "dormant and moribund, a harsher term would be defunct". Ramgobin's wife, Ela Gandhi, the granddaughter of Mahatma Gandhi, later said that for the NIC the 1960s were:

really dark years when we felt complete disillusionment. The bannings took place in 1963, the arrests took place within 3 years and there was a deep sort of gloom and unhappiness. There was a lot of fear in the community... There was this whole scare for communism and it was very orchestrated from the government. People were afraid because they [government]... could detain you without reason, ban you without reason. People didn't know what was legal and what was illegal and that fear of being banned or being arrested was there because of the uncertainty.

== Revived activism: 1971–1991 ==
=== Relaunch ===
The establishment of the South African Indian Council led to concerns among progressive Indians, especially NIC stalwarts, that the apartheid government would succeed in co-opting dissent and elevating conservative Indians to dominate political discourse in the community. According to Mewa Ramgobin, he and several friends discussed this concern in June 1971, leading to the call for a community meeting on the matter later that month. At the meeting, held at Durban's Bolton Hall on 25 June, attendees agreed to revive the NIC and established an ad hoc committee, chaired by Ramgobin, to carry out the task. Within a month, 29 NIC branches had been established across the province, and the organisation was officially relaunched at a convention at the Phoenix Settlement on 2 October 1971, Gandhi's birthday. Albert Luthuli's widow, Nokukhanya Bhengu, opened the convention.

Two weeks before the convention, presumptive NIC president Ramgobin had been banned, meaning that he could not attend the convention. Instead, George Sewpersadh served as NIC president, though he in turn was banned from 1973 to 1978, during which time M. J. Naidoo held the presidency. Naidoo served again as president in the 1980s, until he was ousted in 1988.

=== Composition and criticism ===
The organisation's relaunch coincided with the so-called Durban moment, the dual ascendancy of the Black Consciousness movement and fledgling trade union movement. The relaunch of the NIC was severely criticised among activists from the former quarter, who protested outside the Bolton Hall meeting; they argued that the revival of a political organisation based on narrow Indian identity would undermine inter-ethnic black solidarity (defined in Steve Biko's philosophy as solidarity among all non-white oppressed groups, not only black Africans). Two prominent Black Consciousness activists of Indian descent, Saths Cooper and Strini Moodley, opposed NIC's revival but initially joined the NIC executive, in Moodley's phrase "primarily because we wanted to change the way in which they were thinking". This did not ameliorate severe tensions between the NIC and Black Consciousness organisations, which were publicly evident by the following year, and Cooper resigned from the NIC executive in June 1972.

In addition, those concerned with class issues were concerned that the NIC was dominated once more by the middle classes, and Ela Gandhi later conceded that the newly revived NIC had failed to attract mass support. Farouk Meer, brother of Fatima and an active participant in the relaunch, later described:

When we were revived in 1971, we were nothing more than a protest voice, raising issues from time to time. We were certainly not mass-based. We met on a regular basis, we chartered various issues that needed to be taken up, and took up those largely in the form of petitions or press statements. It was nothing more than a flag-carrying organisation to say, "you know, we are here."

However, from the late 1970s, the direction and public profile of the NIC was strongly influenced by a younger generation of Indian community activists, including Pravin Gordhan, Yunus Mohamed, Zak Yacoob, Charm and Maggie Govender, and Roy Padayachie. These activists were among the leaders of civic organisations like the Chatsworth Housing Action Committee, the Phoenix Working Committee, and the Durban Housing Committee, and their affiliation to the NIC increased mass support for the organisation and increased its involvement in service delivery issues.

=== United Democratic Front ===
A central question for the NIC during the first half of the 1970s was what stance it should adopt on Indian participation in apartheid structures, including the South African Indian Council. Following years of debate, the organisation resolved in June 1975 that it was strongly opposed to the SAIC and to participation therein. It formed the Anti-South African Indian Council Committee in November 1977, chaired by Monty Naicker. The NIC extended its anti-participation stance to the new Tricameral Parliament, established under the 1983 constitution, which included an Indian-only parliamentary house called the House of Delegates.

In January 1983, the NIC responded favourably to the TIC's call for a broad and united popular front against apartheid. When the United Democratic Front (UDF) was established later that year, the NIC was a founding affiliate, and three NIC members served on the inaugural UDF regional executive in Natal. The NIC was subsequently a key figure in the UDF's campaign to boycott the 1984 elections to the Tricameral Parliament. As a result, NIC leaders attracted the interest of apartheid security forces, and four NIC members – Sewpersadh, Ramgobin, Naidoo, and Billy Nair – were among the Durban Six who in 1984 evaded arrest by taking refuge in the British consulate in Durban. All but Nair were subsequently charged with, and then acquitted of, treason in the Pietermaritzburg Treason Trial.

As in the 1960s, several leading NIC members retained ties to the exiled ANC and SACP – also allies of the UDF – and in the late 1980s, NIC members including Nair and Pravin Gordhan became operatives in the ANC's Operation Vula.

== Democratic transition: 1991–1994 ==
The ANC and SACP were unbanned in 1990 in order to facilitate the conduct of negotiations to end apartheid; the UDF disbanded the following year and was largely absorbed into the ANC. During this period, the NIC and its Transvaal counterpart held various meetings with the ANC leadership to discuss their fate. In 1990, Ramgobin, Meer, and Yunus Carrim all told press that they expected the NIC to have a limited lifespan and to disband once it had helped attract an Indian constituency to the ANC. In June that year, the NIC and TIC decided at a joint meeting to disband and join the ANC, though both were represented independently at the Convention for a Democratic South Africa.

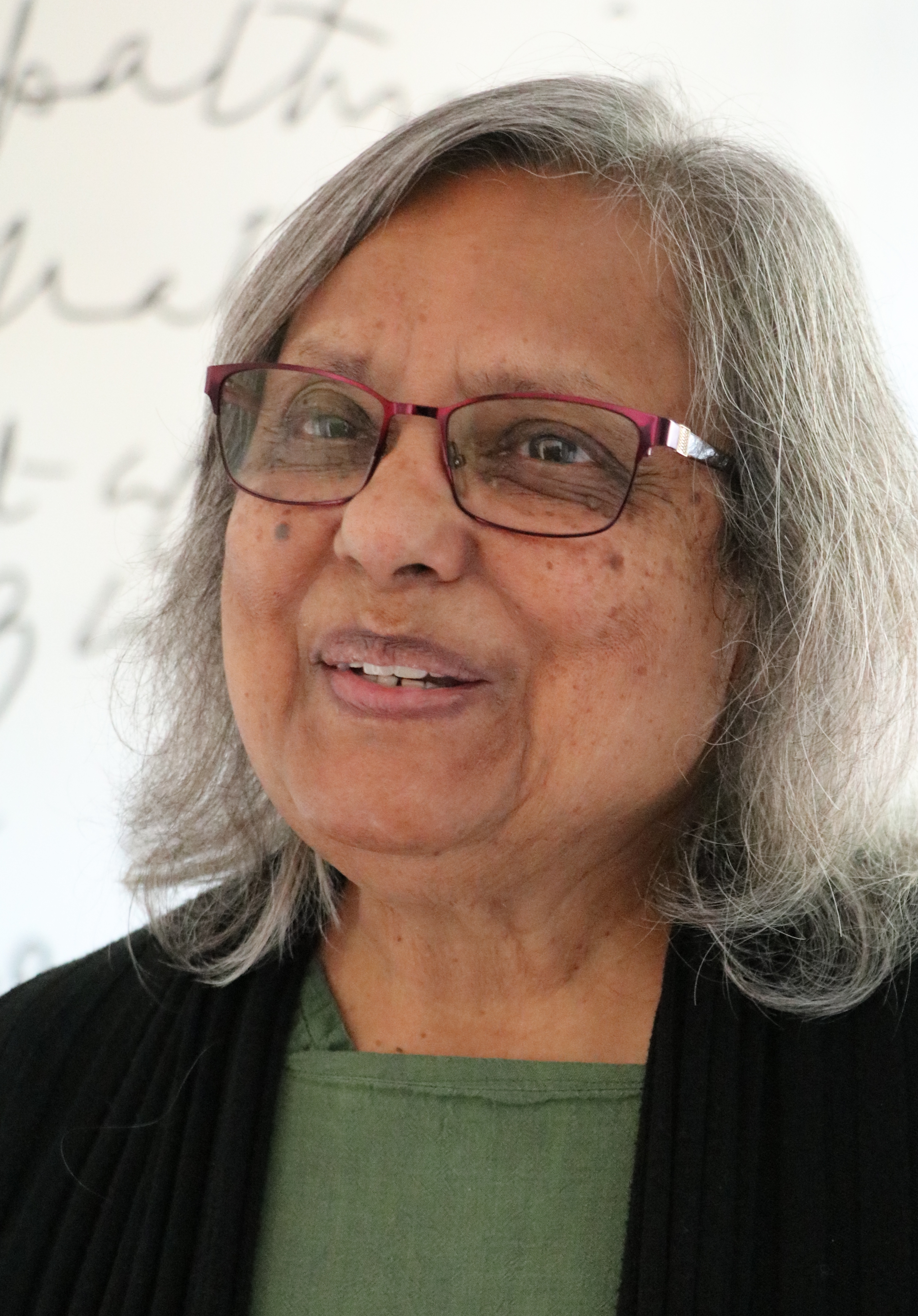
Gandhi's granddaughter, Ela Gandhi, a former NIC vice-president, represented the ANC in the first democratic Parliament

In March 1993, however, as the 1994 general election approached, the ANC met with the TIC and NIC, and they jointly reversed the early decision, deciding that the NIC and TIC should remain in place in order to mobilise minority support for the ANC ahead of the elections. During the election, held within months of the NIC's centenary, many of the NIC's leaders (including Ela Gandhi, Gordhan, Ramgobin, Carrim, and Nair) were elected to represent the ANC in the National Assembly or provincial legislatures. The NIC ultimately never formally disbanded but "simply faded into the folds of history", with the vast majority of its leadership and committed membership henceforth represented by the ANC.

== See also ==
- Indian Opinion
- Indian Ambulance Corps
- Natal Legislative Assembly Bill
- Apartheid legislation
- Parsee Rustomjee
- University of Durban-Westville
- Category:Natal Indian Congress politicians
