= Zuzifa Buthelezi =

South African politician

HRH Prince Inkosi Prince Zuzifa Buthelezi

Member of the National Assembly of South Africa

Inkosi of the Buthelezi Clan
- Incumbent
- Assumed office 14 June 2024
- Preceded by: Mangosuthu Buthelezi

Personal details
- Born: Ntuthukoyezwe Zuzifa Buthelezi; January 16, 1955 (age 71) Mahlabathini, Natal Province, South Africa
- Party: Inkatha Freedom Party
- Spouse: uNdlunkulu MaMohale
- Parent(s): Mangosuthu Buthelezi (father); Irene Buthelezi (mother)
- Education: University of Natal
- Occupation: Politician, Traditional Leader
- Committees: Portfolio Committee on Planning, Monitoring and Evaluation
- Website: www.parliament.gov.za/person-details/5319

Prince Ntuthukoyezwe Zuzifa Buthelezi (born 16 January 1955) is a South African politician and current member of the National Assembly of South Africa from the Inkatha Freedom Party.

== Personal life ==
His father was Prince Mangosuthu Buthelezi, Inkosi of the Buthelezi clan and Traditional Prime Minister of the Zulu people. Following his father's death he was named the rightful successor as head of the clan.

He is an Inkosi of the Buthelezi clan in KwaPhindangene. Currently serving as a member of the National Assembly, he is married to uNdlunkulu MaMohale.

== See also ==
- List of National Assembly members of the 28th Parliament of South Africa
