= Walter Felgate =

South African politician (1930–2008)

Member of the KwaZulu-Natal Provincial Legislature
- In office July 1998 – February 2003

Member of the National Assembly
- In office May 1994 – August 1997

Personal details
- Born: Walter Sidney Felgate; 19 November 1930 Pretoria, Transvaal; Union of South Africa
- Died: 3 January 2008 (aged 77) Johannesburg, Gauteng; Republic of South Africa
- Party: African National Congress (since 1997)
- Other political affiliations: Inkatha Freedom Party (until 1997)
- Spouse: Sue Felgate (divorced)
- Education: Pretoria Boys High School
- Alma mater: University of Natal

Walter Sidney Felgate (19 November 1930 – 3 January 2008) was a South African politician, businessman, and anthropologist. He served in the National Assembly from 1994 to 1997 and then in the KwaZulu-Natal Provincial Legislature from 1998 until his retirement in 2003.

After becoming involved in anti-apartheid politics through the Christian Institute, Felgate rose to prominence through his affiliation with the Inkatha Freedom Party (IFP) and its leader, Mangosuthu Buthelezi. He was a speechwriter and close confidante of Buthelezi and later represented the party during the negotiations to end apartheid and subsequent constitutional negotiations. Although he was viewed as an IFP hardliner, he resigned from the party and from his parliamentary seat in August 1997. In subsequent months, he implicated Buthelezi in state-sponsored political violence, including in testimony to the Truth and Reconciliation Commission.

Upon leaving the IFP in 1997, Felgate joined the African National Congress, which nominated him to serve in the KwaZulu-Natal Legislature from July 1998. He retired in February 2003.

== Early life and apartheid-era career ==
Felgate was born on 19 November 1930 in Pretoria in the former Transvaal. After matriculating from Pretoria Boys High School in 1949, he enrolled at the University of Pretoria to study medicine. However, his studies were disrupted by his marriage; with his wife, he went to live in Ndola, in what was then Northern Rhodesia, and then moved to the South Coast of Natal, where he worked as a railway clerk for seven years.

During this period, in his mid-20s, Felgate joined the Liberal Party and became a lay preacher in the Methodist Church. He also developed a ski-boat business on the South Coast. At the same time, he began to question the morality of apartheid, and his disagreement with the Methodist Church on racial questions led him to leave the white congregation and join the Indian Methodist Mission in Durban. Felgate later said that he had approached Albert Luthuli about joining the anti-apartheid African National Congress (ANC) but had been rebuffed and directed to the Congress of Democrats (COD), the ANC's white-led ally; he said that he was not attracted by the COD, which he found to be dominated by "very affected, pseudo, fringe personalities" from the South African Communist Party.

=== Academia ===
In 1959, Felgate returned to university, enrolling at the University of Natal to study social anthropology under Eileen Krige. For his postgraduate research, he studied the Tembe-Tsonga, initially on the South African side of the Mozambican border; however, his final research was completed in Mozambique, where he studied the dagga cash-crop industry of the Tembe. According to Felgate, he fell out with Krige over his research, as he refused to publish his findings on the grounds that they could incriminate the Tembe. He was a lecturer in the anthropology department at Rhodes University from 1968 to 1971, when he left to conduct research outside of academia, working for the Chamber of Mines and Human Sciences Research Council in Johannesburg.

=== Mining ===
As part of his research, Felgate was stationed as a participant observer in a managerial office at Rio Tinto Zinc (RTZ), an Anglo-Australian mining company with operations in South Africa. After this, Felgate became an employee of RTZ's personnel department, ultimately becoming director of personnel and an advisor to RTZ's chief, Sir Val Duncan, at the company's London headquarters. According to Felgate, he was introduced to Mangosuthu Buthelezi by Beyers Naudé; both participated in a panel set up by Felgate to advise RTZ on labour practices and social responsibility at RTZ's mine in Phalaborwa. In 1975, he left RTZ, according to him over a disagreement about the development of the politically controversial Rössing uranium mine in Namibia.

=== Inkatha ===
By the time of his departure from RTZ, Felgate had joined the Christian Institute, a progressive ecumenical organisation which advocated for racial justice and opposed NGK's pro-apartheid religious doctrine. His work with the institute led him into close contact with anti-apartheid organisations. He bought Ravan Press and Zenith Printers from the Christian Institute, and from 1975 to 1977 he published The Nation, the unofficial newspaper of Buthelezi's Inkatha movement. Indeed, Felgate was often viewed as having played an important role in the founding of Inkatha. However, according to Felgate, he did not start working for Inkatha until 1978; he thereafter became Buthelezi's principal speechwriter, employed as a civil servant in Buthelezi's office in the government of the KwaZulu bantustan.

Later in his life, once he had left Inkatha to become an ANC member, Felgate told the press that his links to the ANC dated back to the same period, the mid-1970s. According to Felgate, his work with the Christian Institute had led him into contact with the ANC's Oliver Tambo, as well as with Inkatha's Buthelezi; he said that he had only "found myself at Buthelezi's side" in 1978, after Tambo, faced with rapidly deteriorating relations with Buthelezi, said that Felgate would have to choose between the ANC and IFP and indeed "must help bring about the demise of Inkatha".

Felgate was among the first whites to join Inkatha in 1990 when membership was opened to all races, and he was appointed to the Central Committee of the party, which was soon to be renamed the Inkatha Freedom Party (IFP). He was a prominent figure in the IFP's delegation to the negotiations to end apartheid, representing the IFP at the Convention for a Democratic South Africa and later serving as its chief negotiator at the Multi-Party Negotiating Forum, where he was assisted by Ben Ngubane, Lionel Mtshali, and Mario Ambrosini. He was viewed as a "hardliner", and the Mail & Guardian, while admiring him as a "vocal and energetic negotiator", said that he was among those responsible for advising Buthelezi to withdraw from the negotiations and boycott the first post-apartheid elections in 1994.

== Post-apartheid political career ==
=== National Assembly: 1994–1997 ===
The IFP aborted its election boycott at the last minute and Felgate was elected to represent the IFP in the new National Assembly. He continued to represent the IFP in constitutional negotiations – now leading up to the adoption of the 1996 Constitution – and continued to be viewed as a hardliner. He was absent for much of 1995 while he recovered from triple-bypass surgery.

In August 1997, Felgate announced that he had resigned from the IFP to join the ANC. He said that he had been driven to leave by the IFP's lack of internal democracy and by the party's recent decision to withdraw from an IFP–ANC peace process in KwaZulu-Natal. Felgate later said:

I had to get out of the IFP. I was angry at the IFP's intransigence, I was angry with Buthelezi and the [IFP] national council. I could not just resign from the IFP and sit in an apple tree and do something else. I owed it to the ANC to publicly say I was wrong and they were right. How else could I do it but by joining the ANC? Floor crossing was a statement.

As a result of his defection, Felgate lost his seat in the National Assembly. However, he remained in the public eye: in subsequent months, he testified before the Truth and Reconciliation Commission, implicating Buthelezi in state-sponsored political violence between the IFP and ANC. Among other things, Felgate told the commission that Buthelezi had been meeting regularly with operatives from the Bureau for State Security since 1973, and that he had been involved in a secret conspiracy, annulled at the last minute, to disrupt the 1994 general election by triggering a civil war. The testimony was provided in camera but was leaked to the Mail & Guardian. Felgate later provided the same newspaper with further details in a 2003 interview, adding to the election sabotage claims the allegation that both Buthelezi and apartheid-era defence minister Magnus Malan had been involved in state-sponsored training of IFP hit squads on the Caprivi Strip. The IFP's national spokesperson, Musa Zondi, said of the 2003 interview that Felgate "could be a case study of delusion from after-politics isolation and oblivion... The entire IFP isolated him because he had little to contribute, and now his consolation is in sour-grape statements."

=== KwaZulu-Natal Legislature: 1998–2003 ===
Felgate returned to legislative politics in July 1998, when he was sworn in to an ANC seat in the KwaZulu-Natal Provincial Legislature. While serving in the seat, in March 1999, he was attacked by a group of anonymous men at a voter registration site in Mbonambi: he suffered head injuries from a beating with a steel pipe and was also shot at, though the shots missed. The ANC's Bheki Ntuli claimed that the men were associates of a local IFP politician. In the general election in June that year, Felgate was narrowly elected to a full term in the provincial legislature. He did not complete the term: following speculation that he would retire due to ill health, he resigned from the provincial legislature in February 2003.

== Personal life ==
Felgate was divorced from Sue Felgate, a United Kingdom-born local politician in Ulundi who was formerly Buthelezi's private secretary and who remained a dedicated member of the IFP until her death in 2003. He died on 3 January 2008 in Johannesburg after a short illness.
