= Khethokuhle Samuel Zondi =

South African traditional leader

- Born: April 2, 1982 (age 44); Pietermaritzburg
- Education: Diploma in Agriculture from Owen Sithole College
- Occupation: Traditional Leader
- Known for: Leader of the KwaMpumuza Traditional Council and the Chairperson of SATLO
- Title: Inkosi of the KwaMpumuza Traditional Council
- Predecessor: Inkosi Nsikayezwe Zondi
- Successor: Incumbent
- Parent(s): Inkosi Nsikayezwe Zondi (father) and Zibuyile MaDlomo Zondi of Inkosi Zingelwayo Dlomo(Mother)

Khethokuhle Samuel Zondi is a South African traditional leader, currently serving as the Inkosi (chief) of the KwaMpumuza Traditional Authority in KwaZulu-Natal. and the chairperson of The South African Traditional Leaders Organisation (SATLO) https://www.atnews.co.za/new-organisation-for-traditional-leaders-launched-in-kzn-to-focus-on-land-matters/

== Controversy ==
The KwaMpumuza royal family secretly buried Prince Thembelani KaThubelihle Zondi which led to the mother, Bathobile Hlela, claiming that her son was buried without her prior knowledge. The royal family claimed the decision was due to escalating tensions and the rumours surrounding the death, which was believed to be suicide.
