= Cyprian Bhekuzulu =

King of the Zulus

Cyprian Bhekuzulu Nyangayezizwe kaSolomon
- ISilo Samabandla Onke
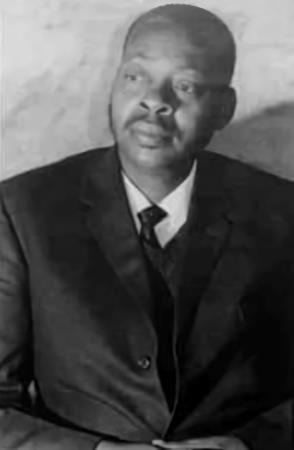

King of the Zulu Nation
- Reign: 4 March 1933 – 17 September 1968
- Predecessor: Solomon kaDinuzulu
- Successor: Goodwill Zwelithini
- Born: 4 August 1924; Mahlabatini, Natal, Union of South Africa
- Died: 17 September 1968 (aged 44); Nongoma, Natal, South Africa
- Religion: Anglican Church

Cyprian Bhekuzulu Nyangayezizwe kaSolomon (4 August 1924 – 17 September 1968) was the king of the Zulu nation from 1948 until his death at Nongoma in 1968. He succeeded his father, king Solomon kaDinuzulu, after a lengthy succession dispute with his elder sibling, Zacharia, which was eventually resolved in 1944. Zacharia left for Mtubatuba where he would raise 7 children with his wife Phumzile. Cyprian's uncle, Arthur Mshiyeni kaDinuzulu, functioned as regent during both the succession dispute and Cyprian's minority.

Cyprian ascended the throne as a chief of uSuthu rather than a Paramount Chief until 1951 when he was recognised as such by the white minority government of South Africa. Even then, he was a social head with no real power. Not since 1879 has anyone been recognised as a head of the Zulu people with an exception of Cyprian's uncle (acting Paramount Chief Mshiyeni) but even he was a regent. This title was granted to him because the government wanted to secure a Bantustan and not out of genuine care for the man or the Zulu people.

== Early years ==
Growing up in King Dinuzulu's royal kraal of Nsindeni in Mahlabathini, King Bhekuzulu was the younger son of King Solomon and Queen okaSibiya. He had an older full brother who went by the name of Prince Hezron kaSolomon. King Solomon had also placed two other wives together with okaSibiya at his father's residence of Nsindeni. In 1925 the Prince of Wales visited South Africa and there met King Solomon kaDinuzulu. During their meeting, King Solomon was asked if he had an heir, to which he pointed his son Prince Hezron as his heir. This interaction was known only to a few within the Zulu royal family as Zulu custom does not allow talks of succession while the king is still reigning. It was thus kept secret so as to protect both King Solomon as well as his appointed heir Prince Hezron. Unfortunately it is believed that the news of Hezron being named as successor was somehow made known within the family and one of King Solomons wives who was living at Nsindeni, poisoned Prince Hezron resulting in his untimely demise. He had only just reached the age where he would herd the cattle King Dinuzulu had left at his Nsindeni homestead. With Prince Hezron gone, the king's other wives hoped that the next successor would come from their family line. However that hope never materialised. In time Cyprain would become king, thereby taking the place of his older brother with whom he shared a mother. Cyprian had an upbringing similar to those of other children in the Zulu Kingdom, herding cattle with his siblings and cousins, and one of those cousins was Prince Mangosuthu Buthelezi who later became one of the prominent politicians in South Africa and Prime Minister to King Zwelithini (Cyprian's son and successor). Cyprian's father Solomon died in 1933 and there was no heir to immediately succeed him because of the princes’ minority, this led to Solomon's full brother, Arthur Edward Mshiyeni, being appointed the regent.

Reyher, Rebecca (1999). Zulu Woman - The Life Story of Christina Sibiya. University of KwaZulu-Natal Press. p. 146,147. ISBN 978-0-86980-964-8.

== Succession and disputes ==
The late king, Solomon, did not appoint an heir and as a result a candidate had to be nominated once the princes reached maturity. The first of these candidates was Solomon's eldest son, Victor Phikokwaziyo but there was a lot of dispute within the royal family on his candidature. Another candidate was Thandayiphi Absalom, the prince regent's preferred candidate. His nomination, however, brought discontent amongst the Zulu people as the prince regent and the nominee were perceived as being too accommodating to the Apartheid regime. It is this growing unpopularity of the two princes that resulted in a legend that a true and rightful heir is yet to avail himself and consequently fueled Cyprian's ambition to inherit the throne. A while back, there was a primary school book in which the writer names Cyprian as the heir. Although the copies were abruptly modified and the claim removed, it did leave Cyprian with a confidence that he was “nominated by the books” and he pursued this claim. The momentum built around the prince and within a few months he had enough following to make the government reconsider Thandayiphi's candidacy. An inquiry was made into the succession issue by the government and in the end, Cyprian was accepted as the heir. His mother had managed to provide a signed letter by the late Chief stating that Cyprian is his heir; the letter was verified to be authentic by the technical experts.

== Death ==
Cyprian died on 17 September 1968 in Nongoma, South Africa. He was 44 years old at the time of his passing and was succeeded by his son, king Goodwill Zwelethini kaBhekuzulu (d. 2021) and his daughter Princess Nomusa kaBhekuzulu (d. 2020) was Regent Queen to AmaRharhabe (sub-group of Xhosa) as Queen Noloyiso after the death of her husband King Maxhob'ayakhawuleza Sandile in 2011.

== See also ==
- List of Zulu kings

Preceded by Solomon kaDinuzulu	King of the Zulu Nation; 1948–1968	Succeeded by Goodwill Zwelethini
