= Frank Mdlalose =

South African politician (1931–2021)

Premier of KwaZulu-Natal
- In office 11 May 1994 – 1 March 1997
- Preceded by: Cornelius Botha (as Administrator of Natal Province); Mangosuthu Buthelezi (as Chief Minister of KwaZulu)
- Succeeded by: Ben Ngubane

Personal details
- Born: Frank Themba Mdlalose; 29 November 1931; Nquthu, Natal province, South Africa
- Died: 4 April 2021 (aged 89)
- Political party: Inkatha Freedom Party
- Children: Makhosazana Mdlalose

Frank Themba Mdlalose (29 November 1931 – 4 April 2021) was the first Premier of the newly renamed KwaZulu-Natal province in South Africa, after the African National Congress (ANC) won the country's first all-inclusive general election on 27 April 1994, while the Inkatha Freedom Party won a majority in the KwaZulu-Natal provincial legislature.

== Early life ==
Mdlalose was born on 29 November 1931 in Nquthu, northern Natal to Jaconia Mdlalose, a general dealer and Tabitha Mthembu, a tutor. He was educated at St Francis High School, Mariannhill, outside Durban. He then attended the Fort Hare University - (alongside future Inkatha Freedom Party (IFP) leader Mangosuthu Buthelezi, to whom he is distantly related) - where he obtained a diploma. Mdlalose continued his studies at the University of Natal and in 1958 he obtained his MB Ch B degree and became a resident doctor at Durban's King Edward Hospital. Representing the students at the segregated medical school in Durban, established by Jan Smuts for Black and Indian students, he attended the only conference of the Association of Medical Students of South Africa attended by students from one of the Afrikaans-medium medical schools. They had hitherto refused to attend if Black students were present. One of the Afrikaner students said, as the conference finished, "I thank the Chair for having organised this conference. This is the first time I have met a black man with an intelligence equal to, or superior to, my own.” To which Frank responded, “I, too, thank the Chair for having organised this conference. This is the first time I have met an Afrikaner with an intelligence equal to, or superior to, my own." -I was that Chairman-. Subsequently he became a GP in Atteridgeville near Pretoria and Steadville and Madadeni in northern Natal.

Between 1950 and 1953 Mdlalose was the branch president of the ANC Youth League. He joined the IFP at its launch in 1975. In 1978 he was appointed Minister of the Interior in the KwaZulu Legislative Assembly in Ulundi, a position he held until 1983, when he was appointed Minister of Health and Welfare, which he remained until 1990, whereupon he became national chairman of the IFP. In 1991, with Jacob Zuma, then an ANC party chairperson for southern Natal, he set up the Peace and Reconstruction Foundation to rebuild the devastation that political violence had wrought in the province of Natal. Following the ANC's landslide election victory, he was premier of KwaZulu-Natal from May 1994 until March 1997 and was one of only two non-ANC provincial premiers at the time, (the other being the Western Cape's Hernus Kriel). During this time, in 1996, he had a meeting with the controversial leader of the Nation of Islam, Louis Farrakhan, who was on a high-profile visit to South Africa. In April 1998 he was appointed South Africa's ambassador to Egypt. After which he retired from the IFP in 2005.

He was married to Eunice Nokuthula Sikhosane. In late 2001 his son, Mandlenkosi, who had just recently qualified as a physician, was killed in a car accident, not long after one of his other sons, Thabo, had also died in a similar incident. They were survived by one other brother, [name?] and two sisters, Kosi and Jummy.

He died from complications of COVID-19 on 4 April 2021.

Political offices
Preceded by Cornelius Botha as Administrator of Natal Province	Premier of KwaZulu-Natal; 11 May 1994 – 1 March 1997	Succeeded by Ben Ngubane
Preceded by Mangosuthu Buthelezi as Chief Minister of KwaZulu	Premier of KwaZulu-Natal; 11 May 1994 – 1 March 1997	Succeeded by Ben Ngubane
