= Inkatha =

Inkatha may refer to:

- iNkatha (Zulu artifact)
- Inkatha Freedom Party, a political party in South Africa
