= Magogo kaDinuzulu =

Zulu princess (1900–1984)

Princess Magogo
- Born: 1900; South Africa
- Died: 21 November 1984 (aged 83–84); Durban, South Africa
- Known for: musician
- Spouse: Inkosi Mathole Buthelezi
- Children: Prince Mangosuthu Buthelezi Princess Morginah Dotwana (1st daughter) Princess Admarah Vilakazi (2nd daughter
- Parent(s): King Dinuzulu kaCetshwayo and Queen Silomo Mdlalose
- Relatives: King Solomon ka Dinuzulu (Eldest brother); Prince Mshiyeni ka Dinuzulu (Elder brother and Regent Zulu King 1933–1948); Phumzile, Zuzifa, Mandisi, Mabhuku, Lethuxolo, Nelisuzulu, Phumaphesheya, Sibuyiselwe (Grand-children from son Prince Mangosuthu Buthelezi); Hlubi, Mthimkhulu, Mongezi, and Zola Dotwana (Grand-children from 1st daughter Princess Morginah who married Dr. Exdras Mafu Dotwana in Daveyton, Benoni); Musa, Nomthandazo, Sindisiwe, Thabile, Daniel, Kwazimina (Grand-children from 2nd daughter Princess Admarah Vilakazi); Toya Delazy (great-granddaughter musical artist residing in the UK, from Prince Mangosuthu Buthelezi's daughter, Lethuxolo)

Princess Constance Magogo Sibilile Mantithi Ngangezinye ka Dinuzulu (1900–1984) was a Zulu princess and musical artist and sister to Zulu King Solomon ka Dinuzulu and Prince Mshiyeni ka Dinuzulu (after whom Prince Mshiyeni Hospital in Umlazi, Durban, was named. She had three children: Prince Mangosuthu Buthelezi (1928–2023), Inkatha Freedom Party leader; Princess Morginah Sponono Phikabesho Tapoti Ntombiyokuhlupheka Dotwana (1931–1996) who married Dr. Exdras Mafu Dotwana (1924–1996) in Daveyton, Benoni; and Princess Admarah Phokunani Sijumbu Vilakazi (1940–1995).

== Biography ==
Princess Magogo was born in 1900, the daughter of the Zulu King, Dinuzulu kaCetshwayo (1868–1913) and Queen Silomo. She was taught by her mother and her co-wives and she would sleep at their houses. They brought her up and that is where she learnt traditional instruments.

In 1926 she married Inkosi Mathole Buthelezi. Princess Magogo composed Zulu classical music and played isigubhu (a stringed bow and a calabash instrument) and isithontolo (a musical instrument which is like a bow which has a string bound down to the middle of the bow) and was also a singer. She continued her music after she married Inkosi Mathole Buthelezi contributing to traditional music. She was a Seventh-day Adventist member.

As imbongi (praise singer) she transcended the boundaries of this role, which was traditionally a male preserve, to lament on her marriage and the lives of especially the Zulu people. Her career gained momentum in 1939 with a recording of some of her performances by Hugh Tracey. In making public appearances the Princess again broke custom, maintaining her dedication to music. By the 1950s, her music was widely recorded and played by the South African Broadcasting Corporation (SABC), David Rycroft and West German Radio. These recordings afforded Magogo an international audience and recognition. Her work was made largely from existing Zulu songs and folktales, and she extended them into music accompanied by the ugubhu.

== Death and legacy ==
She died in Durban in 1984. In December 2003 she was posthumously awarded the South African National Order of Ikhamanga in Gold for her composition and contribution to the preservation and development of traditional music in South Africa.

In 2002 an opera, Princess Magogo, was performed based on her life. It was performed by Opera Africa for three evenings in Durban in May 2002. Mzilikazi Khumalo composed the music and the librettist was Themba Msimang. Sibongile Khumalo, played the title role.

== Sources ==
- Constance Buthelezi on "African Composers"
- https://web.archive.org/web/20051219180245/http://www.chfestival.org/publications/Princess_Magogo_Study_Guide.pdf
