= Mzala Nxumalo =

South African intellectual and anti-apartheid activist (1955-1991)

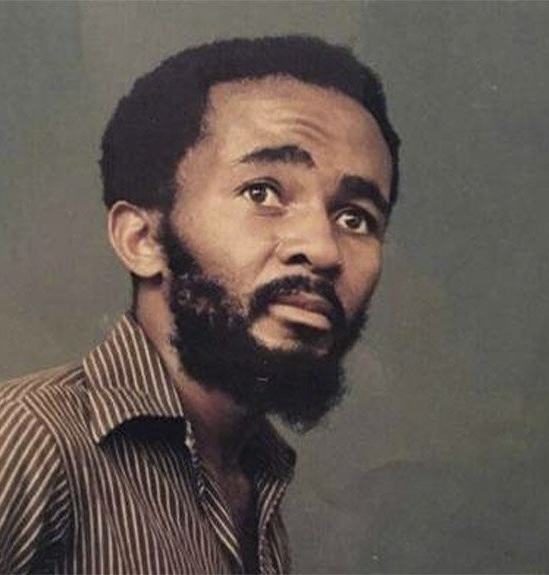
- Born: Jabulani Nobleman Nxumalo; 27 October 1955; Dundee, KwaZulu-Natal
- Died: 22 February 1991 (aged 35); London
- Occupations: Anti-apartheid activist, author
- Organization(s): South African Students' Organisation, African National Congress, uMkhonto we Sizwe, South African Communist Party
- Notable work: Gatsha Buthelezi: Chief with a Double Agenda
- Spouses: Mpho Nxumalo
- Children: Zwide Nxumalo and Balindelwe Nxumalo

Jabulani Nobleman “Mzala” Nxumalo OLS (27 October 1955 – 22 February 1991) was a South African anti-apartheid activist, intellectual, and author.

Nxumalo held significant importance to the anti-apartheid movement. Nxumalo also played heavy roles in the African National Congress (ANC), Umkhonto weSizwe (MK) and the South African Communist Party (SACP) while in exile. During Nxumalo's exile, he would serve liberation movements in Swaziland (now Eswatini), Angola, Mozambique, Tanzania, and the United Kingdom. During this time Nxumalo would write plenty of books, all still subject to heavy debate, about South African revolutionary theory. Nxumalo passed away in London in 1991 at the age of 35.

== Early life ==
Nxumalo was born on October 27, 1955, in Dundee, KwaZulu-Natal. A son of two teachers, Benjamin and Elsie, Nxumalo quickly became infatuated with learning. Nxumalo would attend school in Louwsburg, then later Bethal College in Butterworth, and he matriculated in KwaDlangezwa in Empangeni. He then would study at the University of Zululand and the University of Natal.

== Early political activism ==
In 1972, when Nxumalo was only 15, he was detained without trial for his participation in a school boycott. The following year, only 16, he was arrested again. Being charged with public violence for his role in student and worker strikes. Nxumalo would study law at the University of Natal. Continuing his activism, he would join and participate heavily in the South African Student Organization (SASO).

Nxumalo would play a large role in the Soweto uprising, which were a series of student-led protests in response to the Apartheid and the introduction of Afrikaans into the school curriculum. The students believed Afrikaans to be the “language of the oppressor”. It is estimated that 20,000 students would participate, protests would begin on June 16, 1976. The students would be met with police brutality, with anywhere from 176 to 700 killed.

== Exile and further activism ==
Following the Soweto Uprising, the apartheid South African regime would mark Nxumalo as a threat. As a result, Nxumalo, like many others, would leave South Africa in exile. While in exile, Nxumalo would join the ranks of ANC's Umkhonto weSizwe and the Communist Party. He would Dedicate time to the liberation movement in Mozambique and Tanzania. Later, Nxumalo would move on, receiving training in the political realm and other subjects in the U.S.S.R and East Germany.

Later, Nxumalo would hold a leading position in the ranks of Umkhonto weSizwe. Lending his services around Africa, serving in nations like Angola, and Swaziland. While at Funda Camp, which was an Umkhonto weSizwe preparation camp on the outskirts of Luanda, Angola, Nxumalo was seriously injured by a bullet mistakenly shot by a new recruit. Nxumalo however would go on to make a full recovery.

Nxumalo would be considered a part of the “June 16th Detachment”. This title refers to the mass rise in Umkhonto weSizwe's party members following the Soweto Uprising. This rise in party membership would drastically change the trajectory of the party.

In 1983, Nxumalo would be disguised as a reporter named “Jabulani Dlamini”, working on the Swazi Observer (now the Eswatini Observer). South African scholar Eddy Maloka stated Nxumalo "rode a motorbike that needed only R5 to fill the tank. He always had a pipe between his lips – but it remained forever unlit." In the 1980s, states which bordered South Africa, such as Botswana, Swaziland and Lesotho were all very perilous to the African National Congress's operations. In 1982, Swazi Government officials would sign a pact with surrounding southern African nations on terms unforgiving to the African National Congress's operations. Nxumalo would be detained in 1983 by Swaziland Police.

In December of the same year, Nxumalo would return to Swaziland, this time in the Shiselweni Region under a new identity. Now, Nxumalo would serve as the commissioner for the Natal rural machinery. Which would later become central to Operation Vula, the aim of which was to smuggle key ANC leaders back into the nation, developing communication lines between them. Nxumalo would also set up an Umkhonto weSizwe unit in Ingwavuma. In 1984, Nxumalo would, again, be arrested by Swazi police and deported.

In 1985, Nxumalo would be a delegate to the ANC conference in Kabwe, Zambia. Nxumalo would, then, be deployed to Prague as the South African Communist Party representative on the World Marxist Review, however, Nxumalo's health would deteriorate. His deployment would only last for two months, he would fall ill. As a result, he would be forced to leave Prague for London in 1987. He was the chosen representative of the London region to the ANC's Consultative Conference in Johannesburg in December 1990, however his ill-health would prevent him from attending. While in London, Nxumalo would also work for the South African Communist Party's international committee. Nxumalo would also register for a Ph.D. program at the University of Essex and the Open University. Nxumalo would never finish his Ph.D. as his death would end his studies prematurely.

== Writings and publications ==
Nxumalo was also a frequent writer. His writings and lectures would often discuss the National and Class struggles present in South African society, the national question, and the nations unfolding revolutionary process. In his writing he would assert the aim of the revolution was to eliminate inequality, believing this to only be possible under socialism. Nxumalo would regularly contribute to The African Communist, Sechaba, Dawn, and other journals of the liberation movement. In 1977, Nxumalo was working on a simplified book on Marxism–Leninism in Zulu. However, this writing seems to be lost.

Nxumalo would use various pen names. Only some have been discovered, including Khumalo, Sisa Majola, Alex Mashinini, and Jabulani Mkatshwa. Nxumalo would publish one of his most impactful and acclaimed books, Cooking the Rice Inside the Pot would be released under just “Mzala”. In Cooking the Rice Inside the Pot, Nxumalo postulated the war against oppression be fought at the home front and called for solidarity for the movement.

In 1988, Nxumalo, while staying in London, would release his most controversial book. The book would discuss the controversial former politician, Zulu prince and the traditional prime minister to the Zulu royal family Gatsha Buthelezi’s rise to power. More specifically, the book would be titled Gatsha Buthelezi: Chief with a Double Agenda and be published under the name "Mzala". The book discusses Buthelezi's role in South Africa's political landscape, and his collaborative politics with the Apartheid regime. Nxumalo took issue to the fact Buthelezi's use of the title “prince”. As there were many Zulu royal family members who had not claimed that title. According to Nxumalo, there stands no practice allowing Zulu kings to choose a Buthelezi as a prime minister. "Chief Buthelezi," argues Mzala "has on numerous occasions claimed that his present leadership position in KwaZulu is a hereditary traditional right; that it was not one created by the Bantustan constitution." He continues, "Buthelezi's direct monarchical descent, and hence the claim that he should be referred to as Mntwana or 'Prince' is wrong."

Since the writing's publication, for decades, Buthelezi has rejected the claims made by Nxumalo. Claiming "was never a mere academic dissertation" and arguing that "Mzala was employed by the ANC as a researcher" and "his instruction was to write a propaganda tract that could destroy Buthelezi and Inkatha." Buthelezi has also attempted to remove the book from shelves and halt all reprinting of the book. Issuing legal letters to libraries across South Africa should they fail to remove the book, claiming it to be full of propaganda. However, contrary to Buthelezi's claims, professor Chantelle Whyley and Dr. Christopher Merrett demonstrated Nxumalo's work was a "scholarly work of historical interpretation" and how its "claims are presented in the academic tradition and are supported by evidence gleaned from historical, documentary and oral sources".

== Death ==
Jabulani Nobelman “Mzala” Nxumalo would pass away in London on February 22, 1991, at the age of 35.

== Personal life and recognition ==
In 1986 Mzulu Nxumalo would marry Mpho Nxumalo, they had two children Zwide Nxumalo and Balindelwe Nxumalo.

In September 1987, Nxumalo was scheduled to begin a fellowship at Yale University that would have begun in September 1991.

On April 27, 2010, Nxumalo would be posthumously awarded the Order of Luthuli in Silver for his contribution to the struggle for liberation in South Africa.

== See also ==
- African Communist
- Mangosuthu Buthelezi
- uMkhonto we Sizwe
- South African Communist Party
