= INkatha (Zulu artifact) =

The iNkatha [iŋkaːtʰa] (plural: iziNkatha Zulu pronunciation: [iziŋkaːtʰa]) was the magic and sacred 'grass coil', a symbol of unity of the Zulu nation. The sacred item was normally kept under guard, and Zulu kings sometimes seated themselves on it when going to war. The preparation of an iNkatha can be traced back to the time of king Senzangakhona, the father of Shaka. The last inkatha yezwe (grass coil of the nation) was destroyed in 1879 during the Anglo-Zulu War.

== Preparation ==
Specialized iziNyanga (or medicine men) initiated a ritual vomiting exercise when the Zulu army prepared for battle, by administering an emetic to the soldiers. Each soldier of the impi would vomit into the straw-filled pit, and the medicine men would bound the contents into a thick, coiled mat. The woven coil also included rags of the garments of foreign royals, material drawn from the regimental huts and other substances of metaphysical significance.

== Mundane use ==
Besides the inkatha yezwe, an inkatha may also be a grass coil that is placed on the head as a support when a heavy object is carried on the head.

== Meaning and purpose ==
The iNkatha was a visible expression of the Zulu nation's unity, and the continuity of its royal line. As it was bound round and round it was considered to represent the binding together of the Zulu people, and symbolised political integration and authority. It also signifies "support under stress," due to its everyday use as a head support. Due to its potency in the collective imagination, the iNkatha's imagery was invoked in the 20th century political movements of king Solomon, chief Buthelezi and others.

== See also ==
- Inkatha Freedom Party
