= Solomon kaDinuzulu =

King of the Zulus

Nkayishana Maphumzana Solomon kaDinuzulu
- ISilo Samabandla Onke
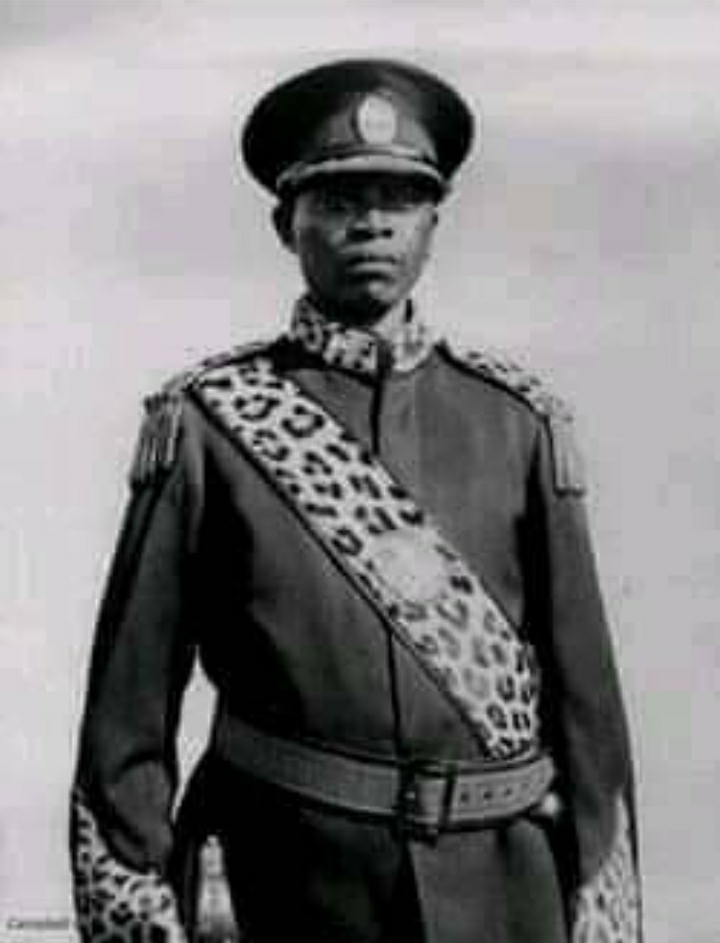

King of the Zulu Nation
- Reign: 18 October 1913 – 4 March 1933
- Predecessor: Dinuzulu kaCetshwayo
- Successor: Cyprian Bhekuzulu
- Born: February 1891; Tristan da Cunha, St. Helena
- Died: 4 March 1933 (aged 42); Umtata, Cape Province, Union of South Africa
- House: House of Zulu
- Religion: Anglican Church

Nkayishana Maphumzana 'Phumuzuzulu' Solomon kaDinuzulu (1891 – 4 March 1933) was the king of the Zulu nation from 1913 until his death on 4 March 1933 at Kambi at the age of 41 or 42. He was born on the island of St. Helena during the exile there of his father, king Dinuzulu kaCetshwayo.

After King Dinuzulu's demise, his body was brought to the royal house of kwaNobamba. There it lay unburied for two days while the royal family debated on who should succeed the king. Of his sons two in particular stood out above the rest. David Nyawana kaDinuzulu as well as Solomon Nkayishana kaDinuzulu. The former being older then the latter. Mankulumana who served as King Dinuzulu's induna was given authority to head the funeral ceremonies. He consulted with a faction of appointed Zulu leaders without consulting all the leading men of the Zulu nation. There they appointed Prince David as the heir and successor to Dinuzulu. This outcome was later opposed as there were leaders who were against this appointment because it took place behind closed doors. Of them were Prince Mnyaiza kaNdabuko as well as Prince Mkebeni kaDabulamanzi. While the kings body began decomposing under the intense summer heat, Harriette Colenso informed Mankulumana of a letter which she received from Prince Solomon in which King Dinuzulu appointed him as his heir. As a result of this revelation, Prince Solomon was appointed King of the Zulu nation.

In conjunction with the ANC he was a founder of the original Inkatha (or Inkatha kaZulu as it was known) in the 1920s. It was mainly formed to act as a rallying point against Jan Smuts' Native Affairs Bill of 1920.

One of his sisters was Princess Magogo kaDinuzulu, who became famous as a singer of traditional Zulu songs as well as for being the mother of Prince Mangosuthu Buthelezi, leader of the Inkatha Freedom Party (IFP).

He was succeeded by his son Cyprian Bhekuzulu kaSolomon.

| Preceded by Dinuzulu | King of the Zulu Nation; 1913–1933 | Succeeded by Cyprian Bhekuzulu |
