= Mahlabathini =

- Location within KwaZulu-Natal Location within South Africa
- Coordinates: 30.679°S 30.162°E
- Country: South Africa
- Province: KwaZulu-Natal
- District: Ugu
- Municipality: Ray Nkonyeni

Area
  - Total: 11.43 km^{2} (4.41 sq mi)

Population (2011)
  - Total: 1,665
  - Density: 145.7/km^{2} (377.3/sq mi)

Racial makeup (2011)
  - Black African: 99.9%
  - Other: 0.1%

First languages (2011)
  - Zulu: 99.4%
  - Other: 0.6%
- Time zone: UTC+2 (SAST)

Mahlabathini is a town in Ugu District Municipality in the KwaZulu-Natal province of South Africa.

== Notable people ==
- Prince Mangosuthu Buthelezi, politician and Zulu Nation leader who founded the Inkatha Freedom Party (IFP) in 1975 and was Chief Minister of the KwaZulu bantustan until 1994. He was Minister of Home Affairs of South Africa from 1994 to 2004.
- Sfiso Buthelezi, Member of Parliament and former Deputy Finance Minister
- Thokozani Langa, South African maskandi musician
- Oliver Wakefield (1909-1956), actor and comedian successful in Britain and the U.S.
