= List of chief ministers of KwaZulu =

KwaZulu (red) within South Africa.

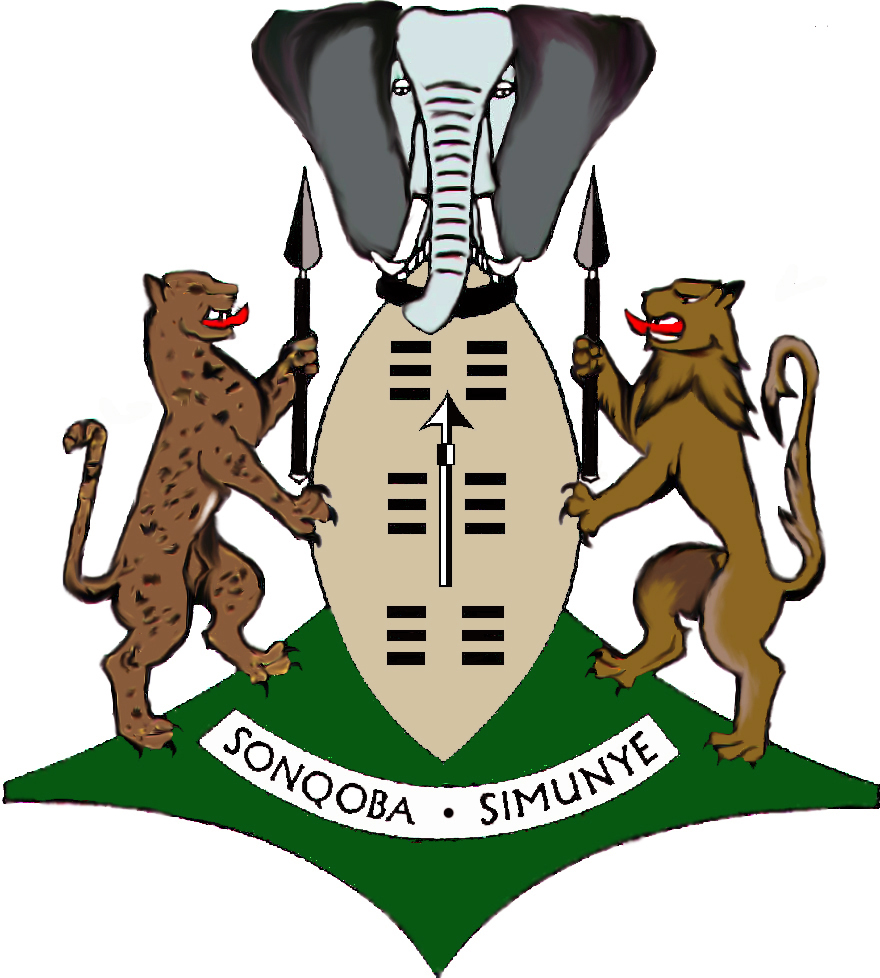
Coat of arms of KwaZulu

The following is a list of chief positions Mangosuthu Buthelezi held in KwaZulu from its establishment in 1970 until its reintegration into South Africa in 1994:

Tenure	Portrait	Incumbent	Affiliation	Notes
Zulu Territorial Authority
9 June 1970 to 31 March 1972		Mangosuthu Buthelezi, Chief Executive Officer		
KwaZulu
1 April 1972 to 31 January 1977		Mangosuthu Buthelezi, Chief Executive Councillor	IFP (since 1975)	1 April 1972: Establishment as a Homeland with a Legislative Assembly under the new name KwaZulu 21 March 1975: Founding of the Inkatha Freedom Party (IFP)
KwaZulu (Self-Rule)
1 February 1977 to 26 April 1994		Mangosuthu Buthelezi, Chief Minister	IFP	Later served as the Minister of Home Affairs of South Africa, from 1994 to 2004
27 April 1994	KwaZulu reintegrated into South Africa			

== See also ==
- Bantustan
- Governor-General of South Africa
- State President of South Africa
- President of South Africa
- Prime Minister of South Africa
- Apartheid
- List of historical unrecognized states and dependencies
