= Inkosi =

Royal title in Southern Africa

Inkosi (inkosi, sometimes spelled nkosi) is a title used in several Nguni-speaking societies of Southern Africa to denote a traditional royal male ruler. The plural form is amakhosi. The term is commonly translated into English as “king” or “chief”, depending on historical and administrative context.

In precolonial Nguni political systems, an inkosi exercised hereditary authority over a defined community and territory, governing in accordance with customary law. During the colonial and apartheid periods, the title was reinterpreted within systems of indirect rule, and amakhosi were formally designated as “chiefs” under colonial and later South African legislation.

== Terminology and linguistic variants ==
The term inkosi originates in the Nguni languages, including Zulu, Xhosa, Swati and Southern Ndebele. Related titles used in other Southern African languages and societies include kgosi or kgoshi (Setswana and Sepedi), morena (Sesotho) and hoshi or hosi (Xitsonga). While these titles are sometimes translated similarly in English, they arise from distinct linguistic traditions and political systems and are not always directly equivalent.

== Titles and succession ==
In many Nguni societies, succession to the position of inkosi is hereditary and patrilineal, though specific rules vary by community. An inkosana (literally “little king”) traditionally refers to a male royal descendant, a crown prince, who is eligible to succeed to the throne. Upon fulfilling customary requirements, such as reaching maturity and undergoing recognition rituals, the inkosana may assume the role of inkosi.

== Female forms and roles ==
Female equivalents and related titles include inkosikazi and inkhosikati (Nguni), kgosikgadi (Setswana), and mofumahadi (Sesotho). These terms may refer either to a queen consort, the wife of an inkosi or, in certain historical and cultural contexts, to a woman who rules in her own right. The authority and status associated with female traditional leaders vary across societies and periods.

== Colonial and apartheid-era administration ==
Under British colonial rule and later the Union of South Africa, traditional leaders were incorporated into systems of indirect rule. Legislation such as the South Africa Act, 1909 and the Native Administration Act, 1927 (later renamed the Black Administration Act) vested authority over African traditional leadership in the colonial and apartheid state. The Governor-General of South Africa was designated the “Supreme Chief of all natives” and empowered to recognise, appoint, or depose chiefs and to define their administrative powers.

Within this legal framework, amakhosi were officially classified as “chiefs” rather than sovereign monarchs, regardless of their precolonial status or cultural legitimacy. This administrative reclassification did not eliminate indigenous conceptions of kingship but significantly altered the political autonomy, territorial authority and legal standing of traditional leaders.

== Religious and metaphorical usage ==
In religious and theological contexts, particularly within Christian usage in Nguni languages, the term inkosi also is employed literally to refer to God or a supreme being. This usage reflects the extension of political leadership terminology into spiritual and religious language.

== See also ==
- Induna
