= Billy Nair =

South African politician (1929–2008)

Member of Parliament of South Africa
- In office 1994–2004

Personal details
- Born: 27 November 1929 Durban, Natal; Union of South Africa
- Died: 23 October 2008 (aged 78) Durban, South Africa
- Party: African National Congress
- Other political affiliations: South African Communist Party

Billy Nair (27 November 1929 – 23 October 2008) was a South African politician, trade unionist, and anti-apartheid activist. He was a member of the National Assembly of South Africa and a political prisoner in Robben Island.

Nair was a long-serving political prisoner on Robben Island along with Nelson Mandela in the 'B' Block for political prisoners. His prison card is the copy used in the post-reconciliation prison tours to illustrate the conditions of the prisoners of the time. He was elected to the African National Congress (ANC) executive committee in 1991 and was a South African member of parliament for two terms prior to his retirement in 2004.

== Early life ==
Nair was born in Sydenham, Durban in the then province of Natal, to Indian parents on 27 November 1929. His parents were Parvathy (daughter of a Passenger Indian) and Krishnan Nair (Ittynian Nair) who had been brought from Kerala, India as an indentured labourer. He was one of five children; his siblings were Joan, Angela, Jay and Shad. His youngest brother died of typhoid in 1942. His father was an illiterate ship cargo man and mother supplemented the income by owning a vegetable stall in the Indian market.

He attended school in Essendene Road Government Aided Indian School in Sydenham and Natal Technikon or M.L. Sultan Technical College (see Durban University of Technology), Durban at night and completed his matriculation in 1946 and diploma in accounting in 1949. During his school year, he also worked part-time as a shop assistant from 1946 - 48 for a timber merchant of Indian origin and as a bookkeeper for an accounting firm.

== Early political activism ==
During his education days, he was politicized as a participant in the students union. Like many of his fellow leaders in the future, the "Asiatic Land Tenure and Indian Representation Act", also known as the "Ghetto Act" galvanized his political beliefs. In 1949, he became a member of the Natal Indian Youth Congress and was elected as its secretary in 1950. He started attending Natal Indian Congress (NIC) meetings becoming a member of its executive in 1950.

Billy Nair continued his string of jobs and matriculation. After the National Party government came to power in 1948, the position of the authorities towards the protesters became very hostile. After six months stint as a dairy worker at Clover Dairy earning 24 pounds a month, he was fired in 1950 as a result of his trade union activities. As he explained in an interview in 1984 about this period, "We had to politicize workers. A means to establish a link between political struggle and the struggle for higher wages had to be found". He continued his trade union activities, eventually becoming the full-time secretary of the Dairy Worker's Union in 1951. He was banned from political activities as part of the ban imposed in Natal of all that had served as secretaries of 16 trade unions under the Suppression of Communism Act.

Nair came under the influence of Dr. G. M. "Monty" Naicker, president of the Natal Indian Congress. In the resistance again the Ghetto act, no fewer than 2000 prisoners were arrested. Nair was among the first group of resisters who were arrested at the Berea station with 21 other fellow-protesters for entering a "Europeans only" waiting room. He was imprisoned for one month.

== Anti-apartheid activism ==
In 1953 Nair joined the secretly reconstituted South African Communist party and was a leading member of the South African Congress of Trade Unions when it was formed in 1955 and served on its national executive committee.

Nair was among the 150 activists arrested with Mandela on 5 December 1956 and charged with treason. The marathon Treason Trial of 1956–1961 followed. Two months into the trial, the initial indictment was dropped, and immediately a new indictment was issued against 30 people, all ANC members. He was acquitted of all charges. Speaking of the incident, Nair later remarked, "The State wanted to actually bottle us up, thinking that the struggle will die out...".

=== Umkhonto we Sizwe: 1961–1963 ===
After the banning of ANC in 1960, Nair became a member of the underground organization Umkhonto we Sizwe (MK) which was led by Mandela. Nair went underground for two months before being arrested and detained for 3 months. He was banned for 2 years which was subsequently extended to 5 years in 1961. Between 1961 and 1963, he participated in the armed struggle as part of MK and was involved in the bombing of Indian Affairs Department.

=== Robben Island: 1963–1984 ===
On 6 July 1963, Nair was arrested and charged with sabotage and attempting to overthrow the government by violent means and sentenced to 20 years on Robben Island along with other members of the Natal Command of MK, including Curnick Ndlovu, Ebrahim Ebrahim, Natoo Barberina, Riot Mkwanazi, Albert Duma, Eric Mtshali and 12 others.

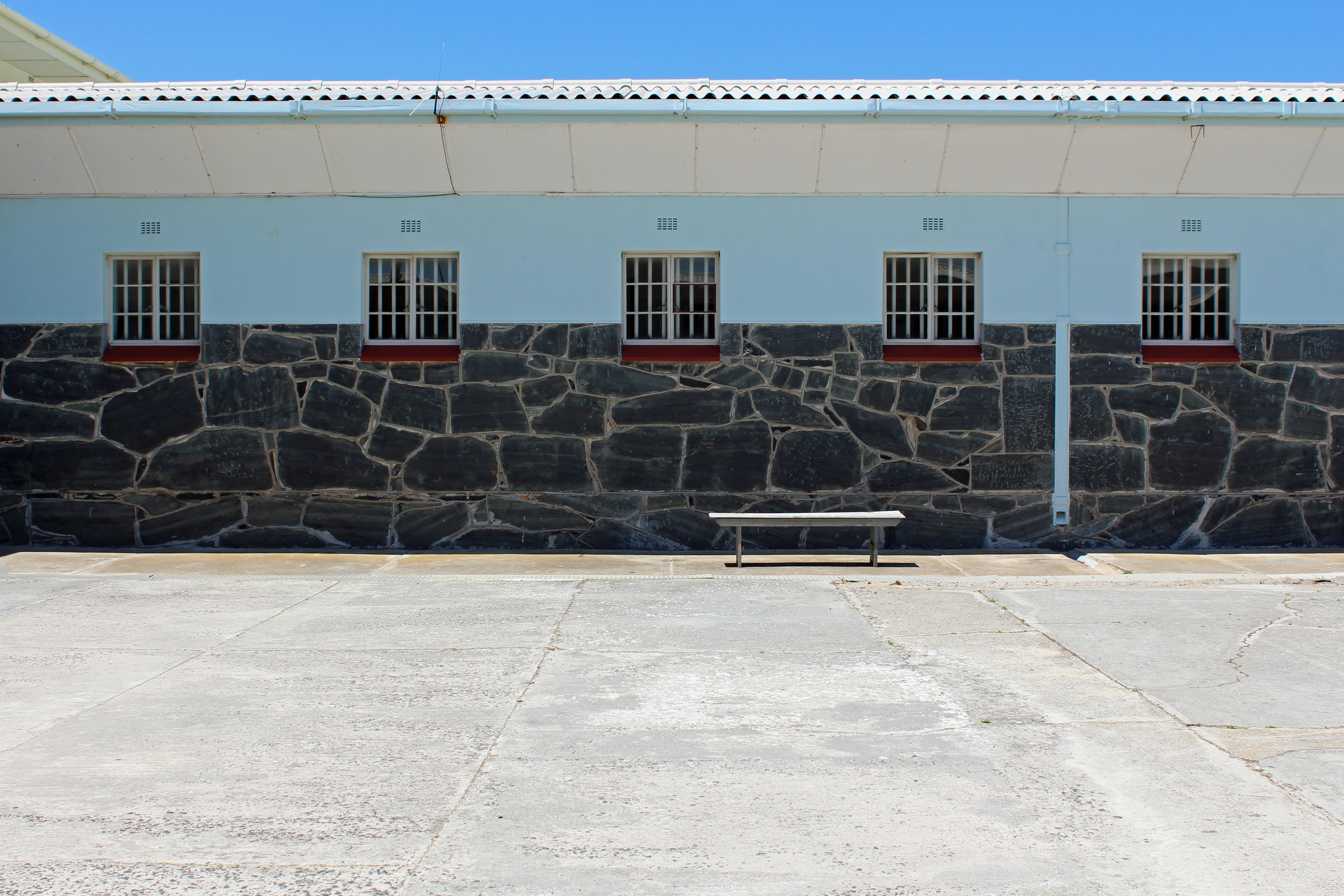
"B" Section in Robben Island Maximum Security Prison where Nair was housed

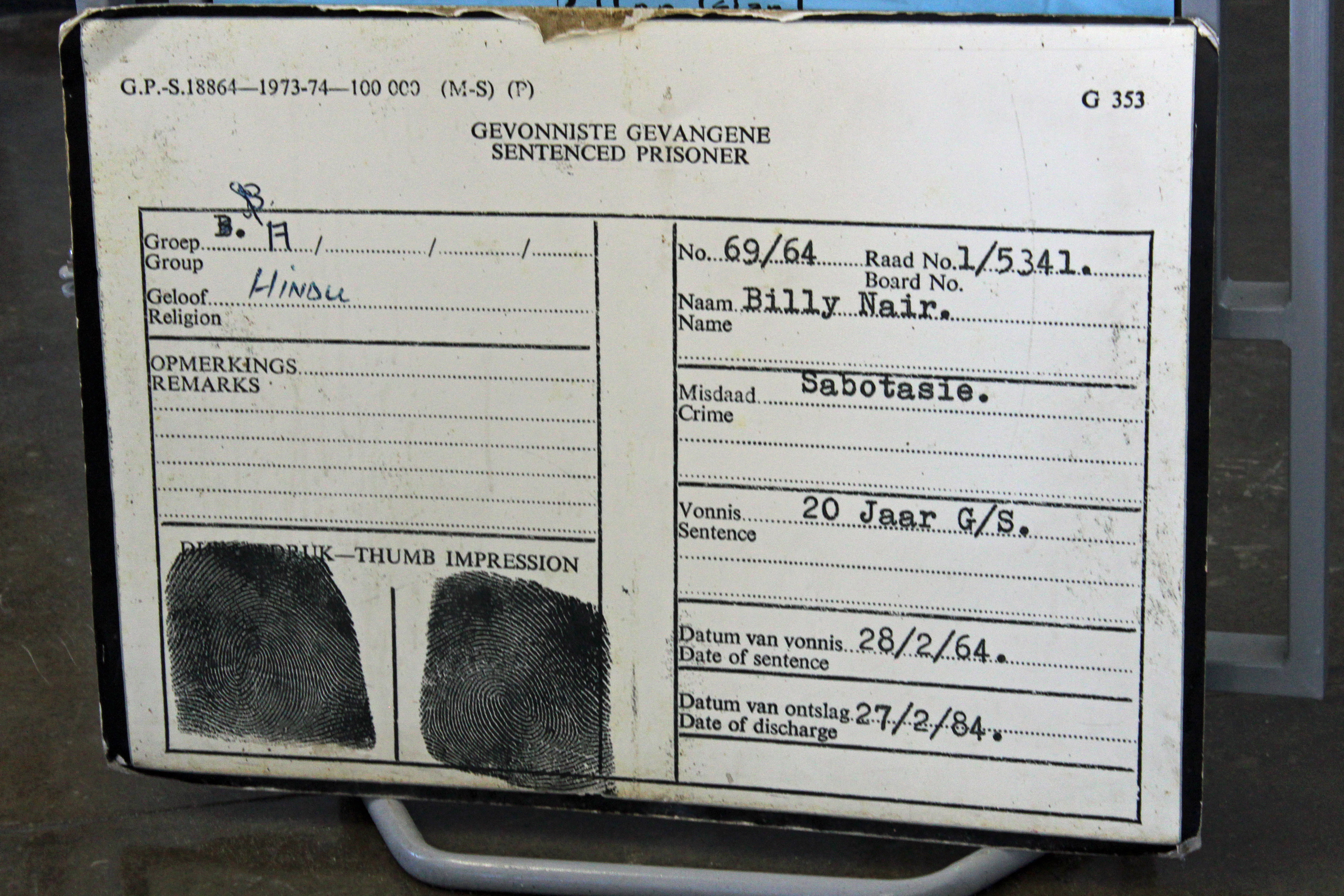
Billy Nair's prisoner card

Billy Nair, as Prisoner 69/64 (the 69th prisoner of 1964) served in the same block as Mandela and Kathrada.

Billy Nair was assaulted multiple times in prison quite seriously and he joined multiple efforts including a five-day hunger strike to bring about reforms at the prison. In this, he partially succeeded. He was punished severely for his efforts by isolation and removal to the common block. He was also denied food and educational privileges for various periods of time. There was controversy on which groups were instrumental in making the changes in Robben Island, including the provision of beds of prisoners, permission to study and improved meals with various groups claiming credit. Upon release, he remarked on this, "when I came out of prison in 1984 I actually publicly said that these Coopers, the AZAPOS, the Strini Moodleys and the whole shoot of them actually came into a five star hotel. We changed the conditions so much that they were living in milk and honey virtually."

Whilst in prison, Nair was an active participant of the "University" which was informal education system run by prisoners; he also obtained study privileges in time and completed B.A. (in English), and B.COM degrees through the University of South Africa. Even though he completed most of the required classes toward a B.PROC degree, he had to abandon it after several detentions. Sonny Venkatrathnam, a fellow prisoner smuggled a copy of Shakespeare into the prison in which all the leading prisoners marked their favorite passages; this copy was later called the Robben Island Bible. Billy Nair chose Caliban's lines from The Tempest: 'This island's mine, by Sycorax my mother'.

=== United Democratic Front: 1984–1990 ===
Nair was released from prison on 27 February 1984 and immediately joined the United Democratic Front (UDF), a popular front against apartheid that had been established the year before. He was elected to the national executive committee and regional executive committee of the UDF, became vice-chairperson of the Durban Central Residents' Association, and established the Centre for Community and Labour Studies, a labour-aligned think-tank.

Meanwhile, the UDF mounted a successful campaign to protest the 1984 elections to the new Tricameral Parliament, provoking a stringent state response. Nair was arrested in August 1984 with several other UDF leaders, held under the Internal Security Act, 1982 and accused of trying to "create a revolutionary climate". After a judge ordered their release in early September, Nair and five others – Archie Gumede, Mewa Ramgobin, George Sewpershad, M. J. Naidoo, and Paul David – sought to avert their re-arrest by taking refuge in the British consulate in Durban. As one of the so-called Durban Six, Nair sheltered in the consulate between September and December 1984. At the end of the ordeal, he was the only one of the six who was not re-arrested and charged with treason in the Pietermaritzburg Treason Trial.

Although he escaped treason charges, Nair was detained again in late August 1985 and held under the Internal Security Act, 1982. A month into his detention without trial, Nair successfully approached the Natal Supreme Court with an application to interdict the security police from assaulting him, alleging that he had been assaulted and harassed by two police officers. He was ultimately released on 9 October 1985. Thereafter, between June 1986 and February 1990, he went into hiding to evade further arrest, though he continued his activism underground. Among other things he represented the SACP at its 1989 conference in Havana, Cuba, and he also worked on Operation Vula.

=== Transition: 1990–1994 ===
Nair left hiding after the ANC and SACP were unbanned in February 1990 at an advanced stage of the negotiations to end apartheid. However, on 23 July 1990, he and several other Operation Vula operatives were arrested in Durban. During his subsequent detention, Nair suffered a heart attack, and he was released shortly after undergoing double bypass surgery. After his release, he served on the interim leadership corps of both the ANC and the SACP, which were working to re-establish their legal structures inside South Africa. In July 1990 he was elected to the SACP Central Committee, and the ANC's 48th National Conference in December 1991 elected him to a three-year term as a member of the ANC National Executive Committee.

== National Assembly and retirement ==
In the first post-apartheid elections in April 1994, Nair stood as a candidate for the ANC, ranked 39th on the party's candidate list. He was elected to a seat in the National Assembly, the lower house of the new South African Parliament. Gaining re-election in June 1999, he served two terms in his seat before retiring from Parliament at the April 2004 general election. He had dropped off the SACP Central Committee in 1998, but in his retirement he remained an ex officio member of the committee. Asked during this period whether he had revised his view of Marxism, Nair reflected:

[Marxism] remains relevant. But we cannot be dogmatic. We have to find a way out of capitalism as it is today. The world is not a better place today. Capitalism is a disaster for many people around the world. We will have to find our own approach to socialism... I am convinced that the future lies in socialism. The wealth of this country must belong to the people as a whole. Until that happens the struggle has to continue. There are no ready-made solutions to our problems. We have to be practical. We can't apply our theory in a vacuum. We have to engineer new methods to make it work. It is through the interaction of theory and practice that we will evolve new ways of solving problems. And over time we will find the answers to our challenges.

He died on 23 October 2008 at St Augustine's Hospital in Durban, two weeks after suffering a stroke. S'bu Ndebele, the Premier of KwaZulu-Natal and Nair's former neighbour on Robben Island, granted him an official provincial funeral, which was held on 30 October 2008.

== Honours and awards ==
In 1988, the SACP awarded its inaugural Moses Kotane Award to Nair and Brian Bunting for their outstanding contributions to the party. He was admitted to the Order of Luthuli in 2004, receiving the award in silver for "His contribution to the struggle for workers' rights and for a non-racial and non-sexist South Africa." In 2007, the Government of India awarded him the Pravasi Bharatiya Samman, and the Gandhi Development Trust awarded him its Satyagraha Award. Finally, in April 2009, he received a posthumous honorary doctorate from the University of KwaZulu-Natal; Pravin Gordhan accepted it on behalf of Nair's family.

== Personal life ==
In December 1960, Nair married Elsie Goldstone, a trade unionist who was his sister's next-door neighbour. He had one daughter, who lived abroad.

== See also ==
- History of the African National Congress
- List of Nairs
