= Monty Naicker =

South African activist (1910–1978)

Monty Naicker OLS
- Born: Gangathura Mohambry Naicker; 30 September 1910; Durban, Natal Province; Union of South Africa
- Died: 12 January 1978 (aged 67); Durban, South Africa
- Education: University of Edinburgh
- Known for: President of the Natal Indian Congress, 1945–1963
- Other political affiliations: South African Indian Congress
- Spouse: Marie Apavoo (m. 1936)
- Relatives: Marimuthu Pragalathan Naicker (cousin)

Gangathura Mohambry "Monty" Naicker OLS (30 September 1910 – 12 January 1978) was a South African anti-apartheid activist. He is best known for his tenure as president of the Natal Indian Congress (NIC) between 1945 and 1963. He also served as president of the South African Indian Congress.

A medical doctor by training, Naicker rose to political prominence in his hometown of Durban as a member of the NIC's left wing. After his election as NIC president in October 1945, he led the organisation in its campaign of passive resistance to the Ghetto Act from 1946 to 1948. He became an important proponent of the Congress Alliance and of the anti-apartheid movement's ascendant non-racialism, but he was a committed Gandhian and opposed the movement's turn to armed struggle in 1960.

Because of his activism, Naicker was jailed eight times, charged in the Treason Trial, and subjected to banning orders that lasted, cumulatively, 14 years. Most notably, he was banned between 1963 and 1973, during which time the NIC fell into dormancy. After his return to public life in 1973, he retired from politics, though he participated in the NIC's subsequent campaign against the South African Indian Council.

== Early life and education ==
Naicker was born in Durban in the former Natal Province on 30 September 1910. He was the eldest of four siblings in a middle-class Indian family. His parents, Gangathura Papiah Naicker and Dhanam Pillay, were both descended from Indian migrants who had arrived in Natal via Mauritius in the 1880s; his father (commonly known as P. G. Naicker) was a prominent trader and banana exporter in Durban.

He attended the Carlisle Street Boys School from 1917 to 1922 and completed his matric education at the newly founded Marine College from 1923 to 1928. In March 1928, he left Durban for the first time to travel to the United Kingdom, where he passed university entrance examinations at Skerry's College in 1929. Thereafter he studied medicine at the University of Edinburgh, where he was a member of the student representative council and a member of the anti-imperialist Edinburgh Indian Association. His contemporaries at Edinburgh included two other prominent South Africans of Indian descent, Doctor Goonam and Yusuf Dadoo.

Upon his return to Durban in 1934, Naicker established a medical practice, drawing the majority of his patients from the nearby Magazine Barracks. Initially attracted to community and civil organising, he joined the Hindu Youth Club. His involvement in Indian political activism came later through the Liberal Study Group, an organisation dominated by intellectuals and trade unionists, and through the so-called Nationalist Bloc, a left-wing faction of the Natal Indian Congress (NIC). Aged 29, he made his maiden political speech in February 1940 at Durban City Hall; in his autobiography I. C. Meer recalled that Naicker "took his stand clearly and forcefully".

== Presidency of the Natal Indian Congress: 1945–1963 ==
In April 1944, Naicker became the founding chairperson of the Anti-Segregation Council, which was established by members of the NIC's Nationalist Bloc to pursue mass mobilisation against Indian segregation. The formation of the council was the result of the Nationalist Bloc's increasing frustration with the NIC's conservative leadership, and that frustration culminated at the NIC's congress in October 1945. In a coup for the left of the NIC, the congress elected Naicker as NIC president, with Doctor Goonam as his vice-president. Naicker served as president of the NIC for the next 18 years.

=== Ghetto Act resistance ===
At its next congress in March 1946, the NIC committed itself to a major campaign of passive resistance to the Asiatic Land Tenure and Indian Representation Act, 1946, popularly known as the Ghetto Act. The campaign was coordinated at a national level by the South African Indian Congress (SAIC), with a joint Passive Resistance Council (PRC) composed of representatives from both the NIC and its Transvaal counterpart the Transvaal Indian Congress (TIC); Naicker and the TIC's Yusuf Dadoo (his classmate in Edinburgh) alternated in the presidency of the PRC.

The passive resistance campaign lasted from June 1946 to June 1948, and during this period, in the autumn of 1947, Naicker and Dadoo travelled together to India to meet with Mohandas Gandhi, Jawaharlal Nehru, and attendees of the Asian Conference. In his diary, Naicker described their meeting with Gandhi as "like the vision of a dream".

Over the course of the Ghetto Act campaign, Naicker was arrested and convicted of trespassing on three occasions in 1946, but he was discharged on the first two occasions; on the third, he was sentenced to five months' imprisonment, served in Newcastle and Pietermaritzburg. According to his diaries, Naicker spent much of his sentence reading My Experiments With Truth. In January 1948, when he and Dadoo staged a protest at the Natal–Transvaal border in defiance of the Immigrants Regulations Act, 1913, he was arrested again at Volksrust and sentenced to a further six months' imprisonment. While in prison he reportedly arranged the sale of his own car to raise money to finance the Ghetto Act campaign.

=== Congress Alliance ===
Our struggle has lit fire in the hearts of other oppressed people and unshackled their bonds to unite with all oppressed people of South Africa. We have reached a stage when we can no longer think in terms of the Indian people alone. We must form a united democratic front and challenge any force that will lead the land of our birth to the fate of fascist Germany or Japan.

— Naicker addressing a mass meeting upon his release from prison, 1948

Naicker and Dadoo were also united in supporting non-racialism. In that vein, they spearheaded cooperation between the SAIC and African National Congress (ANC), inaugurating an alliance that was symbolised by the March 1947 Doctors' Pact, a tripartite agreement signed by Naicker, Dadoo, and the ANC's Alfred Xuma. With the onset of legalised apartheid in 1948, this non-racial front led the Defiance Campaign of 1952. As part of the campaign, on 31 August 1952, Naicker addressed a rally in Red Square and led the crowd in occupying a whites-only waiting room at the Berea train station (an orchestrated act of civil disobedience); he and the others were jailed.

In subsequent years, continuing as NIC president and also serving two terms as SAIC president, Naicker continued to embrace the ANC and other black activists; he invited ANC leaders to open NIC and SAIC events, and he himself delivered the opening address at the ANC's national conference in Durban on 16 December 1954. He had a particularly close relationship with ANC president Albert Luthuli; when Luthuli was awarded the Nobel Peace Prize in 1961, Naicker organised a series of events in Luthuli's honour, and a large portrait of Luthuli reportedly hung in the lounge in Naicker's own home.

Meanwhile, Naicker was served with several banning orders and therefore was not permitted to attend the Congress of the People in 1955, but in the aftermath of the congress, in December 1956, he was among the 156 activists charged with high treason in the Treason Trial. The charges against Naicker were dropped on 20 April 1959, but he continued to suffer state restrictions, and a particularly stringent five-year banning order was imposed on him in 1963. With several other NIC leaders banned at the same time, the organisation fell into dormancy.

=== Views on armed struggle ===
Despite his reputation as a left-wing activist, Naicker was a committed Gandhian and a lifelong proponent of satyagraha and non-violent resistance. Unlike several of his political allies, Dadoo among them, he did not join the Communist Party of South Africa, nor did he support the turn to armed struggle and the formation of Umkhonto we Sizwe. According to Billy Nair, he and Yusuf Cachalia were among "the most implacable opponents of the armed struggle" in the Congress Alliance.

== Retirement and death ==
After a decade of dormancy, the NIC was relaunched in 1971 on the initiative of Mewa Ramgobin, George Sewpersadh, M. J. Naidoo, and others. Naicker, however, remained barred from political life; his initial five-year banning order was extended in 1968 and did not expire until midnight on 30 April 1973. Although he retired from frontline politics, he returned to a prominent position in the NIC in the mid-1970s, having been asked to support the new organisation's campaign of resistance to the South African Indian Council (SAIC). In November 1977, he became the chairperson of the NIC's Anti-SAIC Committee.

The Anti-SAIC Committee went on to play an important role in the establishment of the United Democratic Front, but Naicker died at an early stage of its activities: after a short illness, he was admitted to St Aidans Hospital, Durban, where he died on 12 January 1978. Speakers at his funeral included Alan Paton, who described him as "jollity personified", as well as Nokukhanya Luthuli, I. C. Meer, Doctor Goonam, and Norman Middleton.

== Honours ==
On 24 April 2007, post-apartheid president Thabo Mbeki admitted Naicker to the Order of Luthuli in Silver for "His excellent contribution to the struggle against apartheid, for contributing to the uniting of anti-apartheid forces and for putting his medical profession at the service of the poor and downtrodden." In 2008, the City of eThekwini renamed Durban's Pine Street as Monty Naicker Road. He is also a character in Alan Paton's Ah, but Your Land Is Beautiful, a 1983 historical fiction novel about resistance to apartheid.

In 2010, the Monty Naicker Commemorative Committee was launched, with NIC activist Paul David as its president. Its initiatives included Walk with Monty Naicker, an exhibition about Naicker's life and work at the Durban Art Gallery.

== Personal life ==
In 1936, Naicker married Mariemuthumal Apavoo, originally from Port Elizabeth; he had attended university with her two brothers. They had a son and a daughter together, and she also participated in the NIC's passive resistance campaigns. In 1966 their family was removed from their home in Percy Osborne Road, Durban in terms of the Group Areas Act.
