= Ismail Ahmed Cachalia =

South African politician

- Born: 5 December 1908; Transvaal, South Africa
- Died: 8 August 2003 (aged 94); Bethal, Mpumalanga, South Africa
- Resting place: Bethal, Mpumalanga, South Africa
- Other name: Moulvi
- Occupation: Political activist
- Years active: 1931-1972
- Known for: Anti apartheid activism
- Spouse: Rabia
- Children: 5 children
- Parent(s): Sheth Ahmad Mohammad Cachalia; Khatija
- Awards: Padma Shri; World Peace Council Prize

Ismail Ahmed Cachalia (1908–2003), popularly known as Moulvi, was a South African political activist and a leader of Transvaal Indian Congress and the African National Congress. He was one of the leaders of the Indian Passive Resistance Campaign of 1946 and the Defiance Campaign in 1952. The Government of India awarded the fourth highest Indian civilian honour of Padma Shri in 1977.

== Biography ==
Moulvi Ismail Ahmed Cachalia, who stepped beyond the verge on August 8 at the age of 95, straddled two centuries and two continents. What was remarkable was his bearing the legacy of two cultures — African and Asian, said Gopalkrishna Gandhi, the former Indian ambassador to Norway, on hearing the news of Cachalia's death.

Ismail Ahmed Cachalia was born in the South African province of Transvaal on 5 December 1908 to Khatija (Naani) and Sheth Ahmad Mohammad Cachalia, an anti apartheid campaigner and a businessman of Indian origin who was in prison at the time of Ismail's birth. The senior Cachalia was the chairman of the Transvaal British Indian Association who was forced into bankruptcy due to his connection with the organization and the young Ismail grew up amidst anti apartheid struggles. He completed his primary education up to class 5 at Bree Street Indian School, Johannesburg and moved to Uttar Pradesh in India, and studied Scriptures and Arabic at the Muslim Theological college in Deoband to become an Aalim (priest). He is reported to have participated in the non-cooperation movement in India during that time but returned to South Africa in 1931 to join his brother, Yusuf Cachalia, in family business. In the 1930s, he and his brother joined with Yusuf Dadoo and Monty Naicker, in their anti apartheid activities mobilizing youths for militant action but later changed to non violent methods and became one of the leaders of the Indian Passive Resistance Movement which led to the arrest of over 2000 Indians in 1946. However the movement helped in uniting African National Congress and the Indian resistance group together which was formalized by the Dadoo-Naicker-Xuma Pact of 1947.

During the next six years, Cachalia worked with other leaders of the African National Congress, including Nelson Mandela and Albert Lutuli, in the non violent struggle against the oppression of the apartheid regime and led the Defiance Campaign of 1952 as its Deputy Volunteer-in-Chief; Nelson Mandela was the Volunteer-in Chief. He was arrested and sentenced to a suspended 18 months in prison, subject to keeping away from political activities. In 1955, he attended the Afro-Asian Conference in Bandung as a delegate of the African National Congress and the South African Indian Congress, along with Moses Kotane. On the way to the conference, Cachalia had the opportunity to meet V. K. Krishna Menon at London and Jawaharlal Nehru at Delhi. He was detained at Cairo for a brief period on his return to South Africa, but continued his activities and, after the Sharpeville massacre of 1960 which resulted in the death of 69 people, he escaped, in order to escape incarceration, to India via Botswana. In India, he established the ANC Mission in Delhi, along with Alfred Nzo who would later become the first foreign minister of post apartheid South Africa. Cachalia became the deputy chief representative of the Mission.

By 1972, Cachalia retired from active politics due to ill health and shifted his residence to Kala Kacha, Navsari in the Indian state of Gujarat where his ancestors came from, but divided his time between the two countries. After the dismantling of apartheid regime, ANC requested him to take part in their campaign in the first general election with universal suffrage in 1994 which he could not. He was present at the function of the dedication of the memorials of Thillaiaadi Valliammai and Swami Nagappen Padayachee to the nation at the Braamfontein cemetery on 15 July 1994 along with Walter Sisulu and also during Jyoti Basu's visit to Johannesburg in 1997. He died on 8 August 2003 at the age of 94. Cachalia was married three times. His first wife died, as well as his first child shortly after her. Maryam Bhana was his second wife with whom he had one son, Yahya, and four daughters, Hafsa, Saeedah, Rashida and Khaleeda. After Maryam died he married a Rabia in India. Khaleeda preceded him in death by one year. His mortal remains were buried at Bethal, a town known for potato farming in Mpumalanga, South Africa.

Cachalia received the World Peace Council Prize in 1955. The Government of India awarded him the civilian honour of Padma Shri in 1977. Nelson Mandela's autobiography, Conversations With Myself, carries a short biography of Ismail Cachalia.

== See also ==
- Deobandi movement in South Africa
- List of Deobandis
