= Pietermaritzburg Treason Trial =

1985–1986 trial of anti-apartheid activists

State v Ramgobin and Others
- Court: Supreme Court, Natal Division
- Started: 21 October 1985
- Decided: 23 June 1986
- Defendant: Mewa Ramgobin and 15 others: George Sewpersadh; M. J. Naidoo; Essop Jassat; Aubrey Mokoena; Curtis Nkondo; Archie Gumede; Paul David; Albertina Sisulu; Frank Chikane; Cassim Saloojee; Ismail Mohamed; Thozi Gqweta; Sisa Njikelana; Sam Kikine; Isaac Ngcobo

The Pietermaritzburg Treason Trial was heard in the Supreme Court of South Africa from 21 October 1985 to 23 June 1986. In the largest political trial since the Rivonia Trial, the apartheid state pursued charges of high treason against 16 leaders of the United Democratic Front (UDF) and four affiliated organisations. State v Ramgobin and Others was generally regarded as a failure in both legal and political terms: the charges against 12 defendants were dropped in December 1985 and the remaining four were freed in June 1986, while the South African state received international criticism for having instituted the charges in the first place.

The 16 defendants were leaders of the UDF, the Natal Indian Congress, the Transvaal Indian Congress, the Release Mandela Committee, and the South African Allied Workers' Union. Among them were both co-presidents of the UDF, Albertina Sisulu and Archie Gumede. Also among them were five of the so-called Durban Six, who made international news in September 1984 for evading arrest by taking refuge in the British consulate in Durban. Each of the 16 was arrested in Natal or the Transvaal between August 1984 and February 1985 during the period of heightened state repression that followed UDF-led boycotts of the 1984 general election and new Tricameral Parliament.

In a 587-page indictment finally delivered in April 1985, the state alleged that the accused had, through ostensibly non-violent political acts, sought to further "a revolutionary alliance" whose aim was to incite a revolt and overthrow the government. In particular, the state sought to argue that the UDF and its affiliates were co-conspirators of the illegal African National Congress, the South African Communist Party, and South African Congress of Trade Unions. Represented by Ismail Mahomed, the defendants pled not guilty to all charges. In December 1985, following damaging cross-examination of the state's star expert witness, the state announced that it would withdraw the charges against all but four of the defendants; the trial resumed in February 1986 with only the four trade unionists in the dock. The charges against them were dropped in June 1986 after Judge President John Milne ruled that key evidence was inadmissible.

Upon the conclusion of the trial, the UDF declared itself and its methods vindicated. In addition to the embarrassments suffered by the prosecution in the courtroom, the trial had been condemned by the United Nations Security Council in Resolution 560 and had attracted international attention to apartheid security legislation, particularly the Internal Security Act, the law in terms of which the defendants had been arrested and charged.

== Background ==
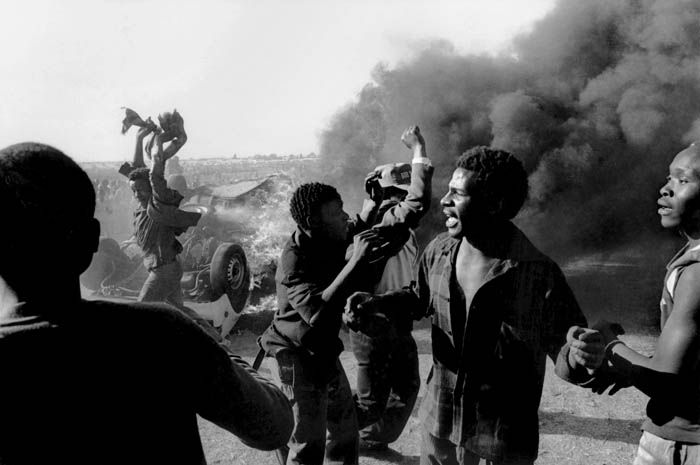
Anti-apartheid protestors in the 1980s

The United Democratic Front (UDF) was launched in August 1983 as a popular front of the anti-apartheid movement. At that time, the African National Congress (ANC) had been banned by the apartheid government since 1960, and the Black Consciousness movement had been severely repressed in the aftermath of the Soweto uprising. The UDF therefore quickly became the largest extra-parliamentary opposition group in the country. Generally – though not exclusively – its affiliates were aligned, formally or informally, to the ANC and to the Freedom Charter. Though its affiliates included hundreds of youth, civic, labour, and other organisations, three in particular were targeted in the Pietermaritzburg Treason Trial: the Natal Indian Congress (NIC), the Transvaal Indian Congress (TIC), the Release Mandela Committee (RMC), and the South African Allied Workers' Union (SAAWU). It was not uncommon for prominent officials of these affiliates to also hold leadership positions in the UDF.

During its first year, the UDF's primary project was a campaign of opposition to the new 1983 Constitution and the Tricameral Parliament it created; alongside the all-white House of Assembly, the new Parliament included two new junior chambers to provide for the nominal political representation of Coloureds and Indians respectively. The UDF and its affiliates were involved in organising large-scale, and largely successful, boycotts of the 1984 general election as well as demonstrations against the new system. The demonstrations turned into or coincided with an unprecedented period of confrontation and revolt in the country's townships and rural areas, for which the state held the UDF largely responsible.

On the eve of the election in August 1984, the South African Police made hundreds of arrests across the country, empowered by the extremely broad powers given to them by the Internal Security Act, including the power to detain individuals on "preventative grounds", without trial, and indefinitely. The UDF's leaders, including those who became the defendants in the Pietermaritzburg Treason Trial, were particular targets. Among those arrested in the same period as the Pietermaritzburg defendants were other UDF leaders charged in the Delmas Treason Trial, which overlapped with the Pietermaritzburg trial but was particularly concerned with events in the Southern Transvaal. Moreover, while the Pietermaritzburg trial was ongoing, President P. W. Botha initiated a series of states of emergency, which gave authorities extraordinary powers to detain and interrogate activists and otherwise to circumscribe political activity. Indeed, the Pietermaritzburg defendants were 16 of a total of 56 people arraigned on treason charges, in eight separate trials, in 1985.

== Defendants ==
The following is a list of all 16 defendants in the Pietermaritzburg Treason Trial.

- Mewa Ramgobin (NIC)
- George Sewpersadh (NIC)
- M. J. Naidoo (NIC)
- Essop Jassat (TIC)
- Aubrey Mokoena (RMC)
- Curtis Nkondo (UDF)
- Archie Gumede (UDF)
- Paul David (RMC)
- Albertina Sisulu (UDF)
- Frank Chikane (UDF)
- Cassim Saloojee (UDF)
- Ismail Mohamed (TIC)
- Thozi Gqweta (SAAWU)
- Sisa Njikelana (SAAWU)
- Sam Kikine (SAAWU)
- Isaac Ngcobo (SAAWU)

== Arrests: 1984–1985 ==
=== The Durban Six: Spring 1984 ===
Five of the defendants in the trial were arrested in extraordinary circumstances: on the pavement outside the British consulate in Durban, where they had taken refuge for several weeks in what became a significant diplomatic incident. There were six fugitives, known as the Durban Six: they were Archie Gumede, the co-president of the UDF; Billy Nair of the UDF executive; Mewa Ramgobin, George Sewpershad, and M. J. Naidoo of the NIC executive; and Paul David of the RMC. David had evaded arrested in the August crackdown, while the five others – alongside Kader Hassim, chairman of the African Peoples' Democratic Union of Southern Africa, and Sam Kikine, general secretary of SAAWU – had been released from detention on 7 September. They had been released after an order by the Supreme Court, which found that their detention was not justified by Law and Order Minister Louis le Grange's contention that they had been trying to "create a revolutionary climate". Le Grange had signed fresh detention orders soon after the court ruling and they were wanted by the police.

The Durban Six walked into the British consulate mid-morning on 13 September, requested British protection, and were reluctantly granted leave by consular staff to remain overnight in the three-room office. They ultimately remained on the premises for several weeks, demanding negotiations with South African authorities about their detention or the conditions thereof. While the British refused to intercede on their behalf, and openly encouraged the fugitives to leave, they also refused South African requests to deliver the fugitives into police custody. In retaliation, on 24 September, South Africa revoked a former promise to extradite the Coventry Four, who were wanted in Britain on arms smuggling charges. The British indicated that they were considering withdrawing their ambassador from Pretoria and expelling the South African ambassador from London.

During their time in the consulate, the six fugitives unsuccessfully challenged the new detention orders in the Supreme Court and extended unsuccessful requests for sanctuary in the embassies of the United States, France, the Netherlands, and the Federal Republic of Germany. On 6 October, three of the fugitives – Sewpershad, Naidoo, and Ramgobin of the NIC – voluntarily left the consulate and were immediately re-arrested on the pavement in front of the consulate. Gumede, Nair, and David remained inside the consulate.

=== Initial charges: December 1984 ===
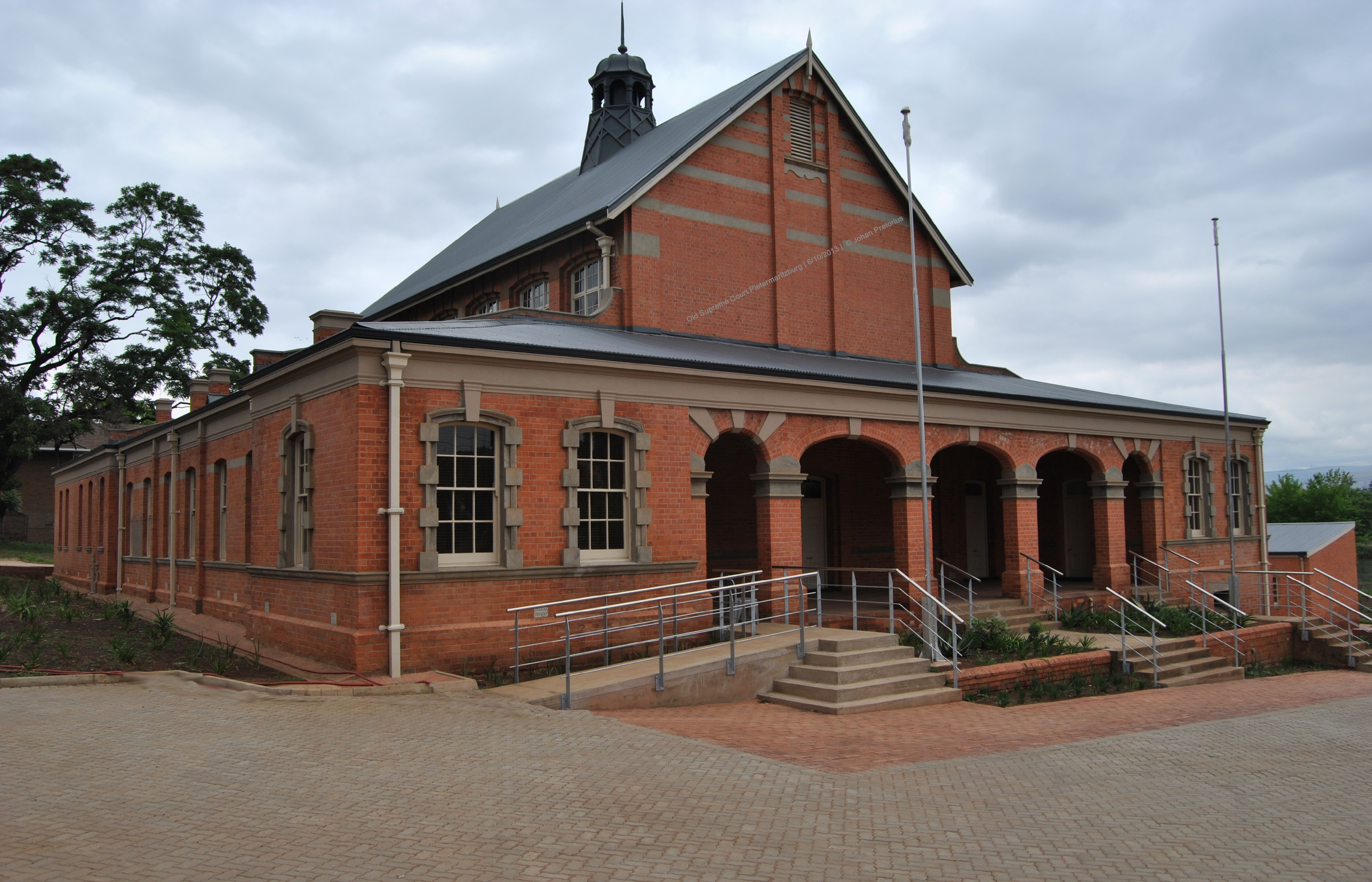
The Old Supreme Court building in Pietermaritzburg

On 10 December, the government lifted the prevailing detention orders against all of the Durban Six, but immediately lodged treason charges against the three in their custody. Charged at the same time were three other activists who had been detained without trial since August: Essop Jassat, president of the TIC; Curtis Nkondo of the UDF executive; and Aubrey Mokoena of the RMC executive.

The South African Police promised that, because there were no charges pending against Gumede, Nair, and David, any one of them could leave the British consulate at any time and "walk out a free man"; the British Foreign Office said that it expected the trio to "leave at once" because "the situation has now changed fundamentally". The trio – then on their 89th day in British sanctuary – hesitated, fearing that they would also be arrested on new charges if they left the consulate, and indeed Gumede and David were promptly charged with treason when they left the consulate several days later. Billy Nair was the only one of the Durban Six who was not re-arrested.

=== Further arrests: February 1985 ===
On the night of 18 February 1985, the police carried out further raids on UDF offices in major cities and arrested six other leaders in Durban and Johannesburg. The six were Sam Kikine (who had been released with five of the Durban Six in September 1984) and his SAAWU colleague Isaac Ngcobo; Albertina Sisulu, who with Gumede was co-president of the UDF; Frank Chikane and Cassim Saloojee of the UDF executive; and Ismail Jacob Mohamed of the TIC executive. The police said that their arrests emanated from the same investigation that had led to the prior eight treason charges. They were soon added to the treason trial as co-accused, which, with the addition of Thozi Gqweta and Sisa Njikelana of the SAAWU executive later in February, made for a trial of 16 defendants.

== Indictment: 1985 ==
The trial attracted international attention as the largest and most significant political trial in South Africa since the Rivonia Trial, which had ended in 1964 with the imprisonment of Nelson Mandela and seven others, as well as the largest and most significant treason trial in the country since the 1956 Treason Trial. It was also the first political trial that targeted the UDF. It was heard in Pietermaritzburg, Natal under John Milne, Judge President of the Natal Division of the Supreme Court, who was generally regarded as one of South Africa's most independent-minded senior judges. N. C. Gey van Pittius was the chief prosecutor. Chief counsel for the defence was Ismail Mahomed, whose reputation as a leading advocate was cemented by the trial. Priscilla Jana was instructing attorney, and also on the defence team were Victoria Mxenge, until she was assassinated in August 1985, and Yunus Mohamed, until he was arrested during the trial for his own political activities.

=== Indictment and bail: May 1985 ===
On 25 April 1985, prosecutors delivered an indictment – running to 587 pages across three volumes – which confirmed the charge of treason against the 16 defendants. Exercising powers granted to him by the Internal Security Act, the Attorney General ordered the court to deny bail to the defendants. The order was struck down on appeal and Judge Milne said that he had reached an agreement with the state that bail should not be challenged further; he also criticised the relevant provisions of the Internal Security Act as "old fashioned" and called for their repeal.

At a hearing on 3 May 1985, the defendants were granted bail on stringent conditions and were released. Bail amounts were set at the equivalent of $7,500 for five of the accused, $5,000 for six others, and $2,500 for the last five. The accused were required to report to police twice daily and abstain from engaging in political activity.

=== Motion to quash: August 1985 ===
[T]he National Executive Committee of the Front reached the following conclusions:

- That the treason trial is a means of reducing the efficiency of the UDF and its affiliates by depriving it of the daily performance of its competent leaders...;
- That this trial will be used to further smear the UDF as a subversive and violent organisation as an attempt to isolate it from the people of South Africa;
- That the arbitrary arrests together with mysterious violent attacks on the homes of UDF members are intended to intimidate the people away from associating with the UDF...

From the above it can be clearly seen that the Nationalists are not earnest when they profess commitment to a peaceful and negotiated resolution to South Africa's problems. It is difficult to understand how a government that is offering Nelson Mandela and the ANC negotiations, if they abandon armed struggle, can simultaneously arrest and charge Archie Gumede and Mrs A. Sisulu (both presidents of the non-violent UDF) precisely for their non-violent demand for a peaceful change to democracy.

– Statement by the UDF on the treason charges

On 5 August, the court heard a pre-trial application from the defence to quash the prosecution, which the defence argued was based on a vague and unspecific indictment. The prosecution's central argument was that the 16 defendants, as leaders of the UDF, had formed "a revolutionary alliance" with illegal political organisations – the ANC and its allies the South African Communist Party (SACP) and South African Congress of Trade Unions – for the purpose of inciting revolt to overthrow the government. The prosecutor said that the UDF was not on trial, but that the state would show that the group, through the UDF, had participated in a revolutionary conspiracy.

However, for the defence, Mahomed argued that the state's evidence was vastly insufficient to prove that the defendants had participated in such a conspiracy. The prosecution's case relied on non-violent political acts by the defendants on disparate occasions in various venues between 1980 and 1985, including anti-apartheid statements in mass meetings, the distribution of political pamphlets, and the singing of freedom songs. The basis for Ramgobin and Sewpersahd's indictment, for example, was the distribution of a pamphlet which called for Mandela's release. Mahomed argued that these acts amounted, individually and collectively, to normal and legitimate acts of political protest, an argument for which Milne showed sympathy. On the Mandela pamphlet, they had the following exchange:

MAHOMED: Why should anyone distributing a leaflet like this be accused of trying to overthrow the state by violence? Since when does anyone go to jail for saying, 'Release Mandela'?... Surely, there must be a lot of people who would be advocating the release of Nelson Mandela precisely to avoid overthrowing the state by violence.
MILNE: For example, the leader of the official [parliamentary] opposition [Frederik van Zyl Slabbert].

Michael Parks noted that the defence's argument attempted to "broaden the right of political protest" such that anti-apartheid activism could be regarded as within the scope of acceptable political protest. Concluding his presentation, Mohamed accused the state of attempting to establish the crime of "verbal treason" (which he mocked as "talk-talk treason") and asked Milne to order that the joint indictment should be withdrawn and the defendants indicted individually. Although Milne did not agree to the latter request, he agreed with some of the defence's objections and instructed the prosecution to redraft the indictment.

== Trial: 1985–1986 ==
=== Not guilty plea: October 1985 ===
The substantive trial began on 21 October in the Supreme Court, and all of the accused pled not guilty to the charge of high treason and incitement to overthrow the government in terms of Section 54 of the Internal Security Act. They also pled not guilty to alternative statutory charges of terrorism and supporting the aims of an illegal organisation.

Observers widely expected a lengthy show trial, lasting over a year and involving testimony from over one hundred state's witnesses. Although there was legal precedent for the treason charge to carry the death penalty, the government was not expected to seek the maximum penalty: critics claimed that the government's aim was not to win the case, but to tie up the leaders of the anti-apartheid movement, prevent them from playing a political role, and ideally disable the UDF entirely. On another interpretation, the government's primary aim was the moral delegitimisation of the movement's leaders and the movement itself, with defendant Cassim Saloojee latter arguing that "a whole style of protest was on trial. This trial was not simply a trial against us. It was a trial against the UDF, against mass struggle and against mass protest.''

=== Expert testimony: December 1985 ===
In the assessment of reporter Allister Sparks, the prosecution's case was brought to "crisis point" in early December 1985 by Mohamed's cross-examination of the state's star witness, Isaak D. de Vries, who was a doctoral student and lecturer in politics at Rand Afrikaans University. De Vries, a prolific state's witness, was presented as an expert on revolutionary strategy; the prosecution's case depended on his theoretical understanding of revolution, and on his interpretation of the history of the UDF and its affiliates, to establish the existence of a so-called revolutionary alliance linking the UDF to the illegal ANC, SACP, and SACTU.

During cross-examination, Mahomed identified factual inaccuracies in de Vries's testimony; among other things, he guided de Vries to retract his claim that the NIC and TIC were committed to violent revolution and to admit that the groups were in fact guided by the non-violent philosophy of their founder, Mahatma Gandhi. After Mahomed accused him of being "a theoretician who has no factual background and no expertise to make statements or assessments", de Vries, with prompting from Judge Milne, conceded that his claims could not be regarded as conclusive. He said that he had misunderstood his role in the prosecution and had made "fundamental mistakes" in his evidence which could have misled the court. On 5 December, the prosecution requested a two-day adjournment – the third it had taken during de Vries's testimony – to consider the implications of his admissions to the court.

=== Twelve released: December 1985 ===
On 9 December, the trial resumed after the adjournment and Natal Attorney General Michael Imber announced that the state would withdraw the charges against 12 of the defendants and seek only to prosecute the four SAAWU leaders: Kikine, Njikelana, Ngocobo, and Gqweta. The state did not explain its decision.

While there is no doubt that we were on trial, apartheid was also on trial and the method of our struggle under the banner of the Natal Indian Congress and the United Democratic Front was held in question. Now there is a vindication, and we do hope that the rulers of South Africa will come to their senses.

– Statement by Mewa Ramgobin, December 1985

The released defendants were greeted with celebrations outside the court in Pietermaritzburg and outside Johannesburg's Jan Smuts Airport, where supporters chanted ''Viva UDF, viva Sisulu, viva Gumede". The UDF released a statement which condemned the trial as "an attempt to criminalize and immobilize the opponents of apartheid" and promised that the freed defendants would "continue the struggle for peaceful change in South Africa". Gumede said that the ordeal had "not discouraged me in the least", and Sisulu referred to the prosecutors' decision as "a crushing victory for us".

=== Four released: June 1986 ===
The trial of the SAAWU four was adjourned until 3 February 1986. In mid-June 1986, the prosecution of the SAAWU defendants faced another blow when Judge Milne ruled that much of the state's evidence – a collection of audio and video recordings of the defendants giving speeches at political meetings – was inadmissible. Milne said that the state had not proved that the tapes had not been tampered with – there were "suspicious gaps" in some of the recordings – nor that the audio tapes were in fact recordings of the defendants at political meetings. The state requested an adjournment.

When the trial resumed a fortnight later on 23 June 1986, it ended abruptly with the defendants' acquittal after the prosecutor said he wished to withdraw the charges. The state did not explain its decision. A crowd gathered outside the courthouse to celebrate the release of the defendants, and SAAWU's Thozi Gqweta told the press that he felt "like I've been a political deepfreeze for two years" and that he and the others remained committed to "continue the work".

== Legacy ==
=== International response ===
Throughout the saga – from the August 1984 arrests until the conclusion of the trial – the government faced "a storm of criticism" from abroad. Indeed, on some accounts, it was public protest against UDF leaders' prolonged detention without trial that led the government to replace their preventative orders with substantive criminal charges. But the decision to proceed with trial was also criticised, leading to the accusation that the apartheid government was "using the courts as an extension of its detention system, bringing poorly based charges against legitimate political opponents simply to put them out of action".

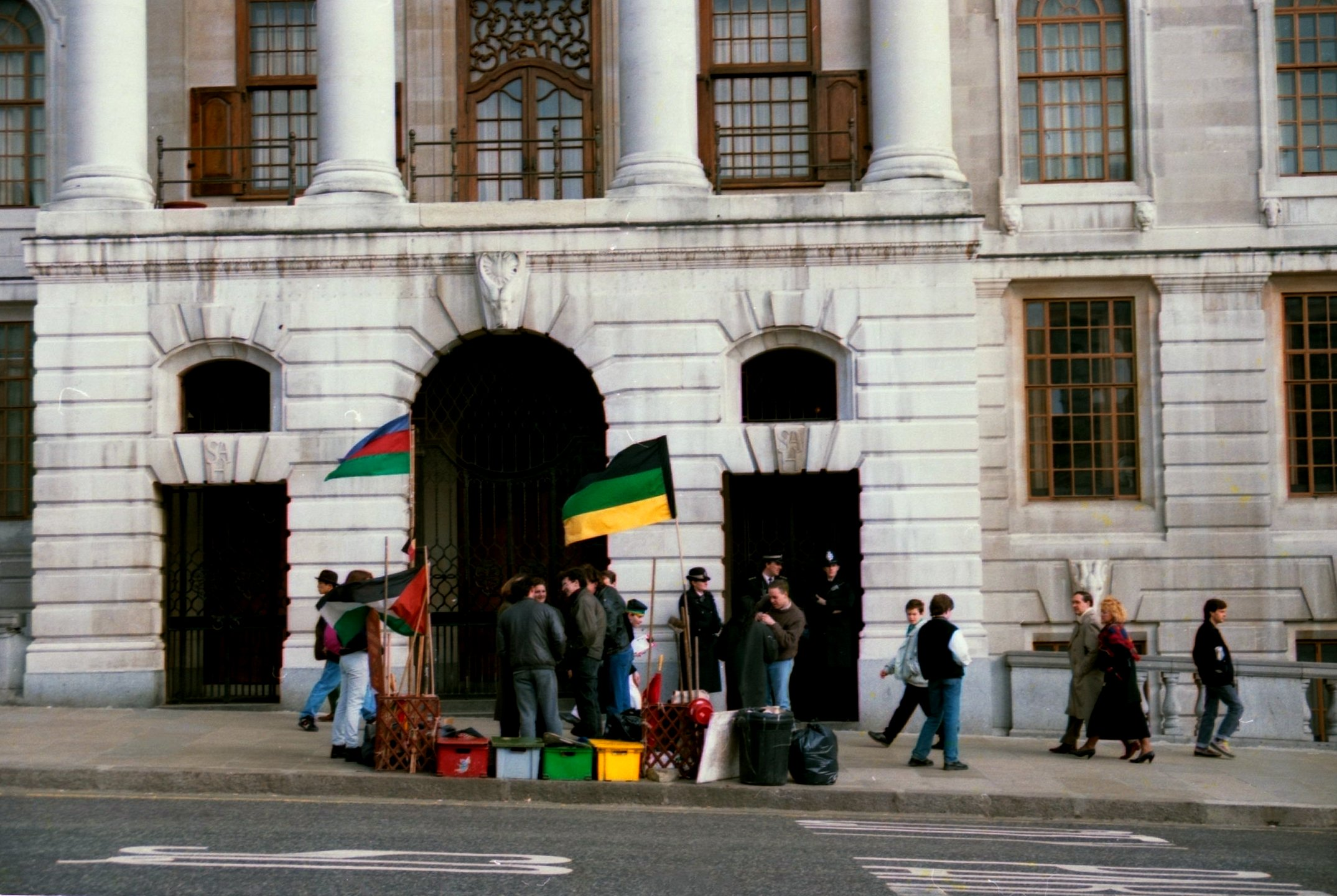
An anti-apartheid protest at South Africa House in London, 1989

On 12 March 1985, the United Nations Security Council adopted Resolution 560, which, in the course of raising broader concerns about the apartheid regime's suppression of dissidents, specifically called for the release of the Pietermaritzburg defendants. South African Foreign Minister Pik Botha said that the support of Western countries for the resolution was "regrettable", and the government continued to insist that the trial was not political but the result of the defendants' criminal activities. Nonetheless, when the first twelve were released in December 1985, political analysts said that the state's retreat might be an attempt to placate international public opinion. In response, the United States Department of State called the release an "encouraging development" but expressed its ongoing concern about the remaining four detainees and promised to continue to monitor the trial closely.

The trial also had the effect of attracting public attention to henceforth neglected aspects of the apartheid legal framework, extending not only to laws of strict racial separation but also to the security legislation through which apartheid was enforced. Judge Nathaniel R. Jones attended as a trial observer, representing the American Lawyers' Committee for Civil Rights Under Law, and reported back to the committee:

The basic problem I observed was not the fairness of the proceedings, but the underlying laws that had given rise to the indictment... My mind goes back to the courtroom where an earnest and decent judge grappled with the law – within the limited authority the system accords the judiciary – in an effort to do justice and realizing how impossible that is under the laws now in effect in South Africa.

Jones repeated his criticisms in a September 1985 op-ed in the Washington Post, in which he said that the trial was "a disgrace to a civilized society". Such criticism was particularly unwelcome to P. W. Botha's government because the government had hoped to present the 1983 constitutional changes as a significant gesture towards political reform and the liberalisation of race relations.

=== Delmas Treason Trial ===
The Pietermaritzburg Treason Trial overlapped with, and is often closely associated with, the Delmas Treason Trial – named for Delmas, Transvaal, though ultimately heard by the Transvaal Supreme Court in Pretoria's Palace of Justice. The Delmas trial saw 22 activists from the Transvaal's Vaal Triangle face similar charges to those lodged against the Pietermaritzburg defendants, and most of the Delmas accused were also UDF activists, among them UDF leaders Popo Molefe, Terror Lekota, and Moss Chikane. However, the Delmas trial differed from the Pietermaritzburg trial in that many of the defendants were accused not only of treason and conspiracy in broad terms but also of specific statutory offences, including murder, that occurred during the September 1984 Vaal uprising, which they were accused of having instigated.

Moreover, some observers suspected that the failure of the Pietermaritzburg prosecution – and the international outcry it had provoked – inspired the state to adjust its strategy in the Delmas trial. With most defendants in detention from late 1984 and charges initially lodged in June 1985, State v Baleka and 21 others was heard from January 1986 until December 1988 in what became the longest political trial of the apartheid era. In attempting once more to criminalise the UDF, the prosecution went beyond its argument in Pietermaritzburg – that the UDF had formed an alliance with the ANC and SACP – to propose that the UDF had explicitly been formed as the "internal wing of the ANC" with the express purpose of effecting ANC president Oliver Tambo's call to make the country ungovernable. The Delmas judge accepted this argument and handed down eleven lengthy prison sentences, though they were overturned on appeal in 1989.

=== Defendants ===
The state of emergency regulations remained in place after the trial's end, and several of the defendants were rearrested. Half of the defendants went on to represent the ANC in the post-apartheid Parliament.

== See also ==
- Banning orders
- Suppression of Communism Act
- Defiance Campaign
- Congress Alliance
- Trial of the SASO Nine
- History of the African National Congress
- International sanctions during apartheid
- Negotiations to end apartheid in South Africa
