= Cassim Saloojee =

South African politician and activist (1935–2009)

Member of the National Assembly
- In office 9 May 1994 – 1 February 2009

Personal details
- Born: Ebrahim Saloojee; 7 May 1935 Krugersdorp, Transvaal; Union of South Africa
- Died: 1 February 2009 (aged 73) Johannesburg, Gauteng; Republic of South Africa
- Party: African National Congress

Ebrahim "Cassim" Saloojee (7 May 1935 – 1 February 2009) was a South African politician and former anti-apartheid activist. During apartheid, he was the treasurer of the United Democratic Front, a defendant in the Pietermaritzburg Treason Trial, and later the president of the Transvaal Indian Congress. He represented the African National Congress in the National Assembly from 1994 until his death in 2009.

== Early life and career ==
Saloojee was born in Krugersdorp in the former Transvaal on 7 May 1935. His family later moved Roodepoort and then to Bloemhof. He began school in Sophiatown and matriculated in 1954 in Johannesburg, where he had moved as a teenager for schooling. Yusuf Dadoo, who was also from Krugersdorp, was an important influence for Saloojee, and he joined the youth wing of the Transvaal Indian Congress while in Johannesburg.

After matriculating, he began studying medicine at a college in Bombay, India, but later returned to South Africa to train as a teacher at the Transvaal College of Education. However, he came to dislike teaching within the confines of the apartheid-era Bantu Education Act and from 1967 he worked as director of the Johannesburg Indian Social Welfare Agency. He also chaired an alternative theatre group, the Phoenix Players, and was a founder of Johannesburg's Market Theatre.

== Anti-apartheid activism ==
After a year in the United States, where he studied on a scholarship at Princeton University, Saloojee became involved in activism against the Group Areas Act as a founding member and chairman of the Action Committee to Stop Evictions (ACTSTOP), which opposed evictions of Indian families (including his own) from rentals in downtown Johannesburg. During this period, in the early 1980s, Saloojee became increasingly involved in anti-apartheid politics, partly due to the influence of his teenaged sons. He was involved in boycotts of the Indian Council and later of the Tricameral Parliament, both formed to provide nominal political representation to Indians in the apartheid government. He was a founding member of the United Democratic Front (UDF) in 1983 and became its national treasurer.

In this capacity, he was arrested in February 1985, and – alongside Albertina Sisulu, Archie Gumede, Frank Chikane, and other UDF leaders – was charged with treason in the Pietermaritzburg Treason Trial. The charges against him were dropped in December 1985. In August 1988, at the Transvaal Indian Congress's first conference since its revival in 1983, Saloojee was elected to succeed Essop Jassat as president of the congress.

== Post-apartheid career ==
In South Africa's first post-apartheid elections in 1994, Saloojee was elected to represent the African National Congress in the new National Assembly. During his first term in Parliament from 1994 to 1999, he chaired the Portfolio Committee on Social Welfare. He became one of the longest serving Members of Parliament, serving until his death in 2009.

== Personal life and death ==
Saloojee was married to Khatija and had two sons. He died on 1 February 2009 at his home in Johannesburg after a long illness.
