= Paul David =

Paul David may refer to:

- Paul David (cardiologist), Canadian cardiologist and senator
- Paul A. David, American economist
- Paul David (activist), South African anti-apartheid activist
