= Sisa Njikelana =

South African politician and trade unionist

Member of the National Assembly
- In office 23 April 2004 – 6 May 2014

Personal details
- Born: Sisa James Njikelana; 10 August 1955 (age 70)
- Citizenship: South Africa
- Party: African National Congress
- Other political affiliations: South African Communist Party

Sisa James Njikelana (born 10 August 1955) is a South African politician, businessman, and former trade unionist. He represented the African National Congress (ANC) in the National Assembly from 2004 to 2014 and chaired the Portfolio Committee on Energy during the 25th Parliament.

During the 1980s, Njikelana was vice-president and general secretary of the South African Allied Workers' Union, a general union which militantly opposed apartheid. He was later the general secretary of the National Education, Health and Allied Workers' Union. He was detained for his political activism on several occasions and was a defendant in the Pietermaritzburg Treason Trial.

== Early life and activism ==
Born on 10 August 1955, Njikelana rose to prominence as a trade unionist based in East London in the former Cape Province. With Thozi Gqweta, he was a leading figure in the South African Allied Workers' Union (SAAWU) in the Cape, serving as the union's vice-president and later as its general secretary.

SAAWU was among the country's most militant trade unions, and Njikelana personally was a firm advocate for the involvement of unions in a popular front against apartheid, arguing that workers' economic repression was inseparable from their political repression. At the 1981 conference of the Anti-SAIC Council, an early precursor to the formation of the United Democratic Front (UDF), Njikelana made a speech as one of two representatives (the other being Samson Ndou) of the black labour movement. In addition to being detained several times for organising illegal strikes, Njikelana and other SAAWU leaders faced harsh state repression for opposing the award of nominal independence of the nearby Ciskei bantustan. Allister Sparks estimated that Njikelana and Gqweta were detained on seven different occasions between mid-1980 and the end of 1982.

=== Terrorism detention: 1981–1982 ===
In May 1981, Njikelana was arrested at the house of Neil Aggett, his friend and colleague in the labour movement; he was detained at John Vorster Square for ten weeks before being released. However, in December 1981, he was arrested again in East London, with Gqweta, and was returned to John Vorster Square for interrogation by the Security Branch. On that occasion, his detention lasted until August 1982 and included his arraignment on charges under the Terrorism Act, although the charges were dropped without going to trial. Before his release, Njikelana was hospitalised for psychiatric treatment, which he said was necessary because he had been disoriented by the electric-shock torture he was subject to at John Vorster Square.

Neil Aggett was also rearrested in late 1981 and died in detention at John Vorster Square in February 1982. In 2020, Njikelana testified at an inquest into Aggett's death, describing the torture he had been subjected to and his last encounters with Aggett in detention. He said that he did not believe that Aggett had committed suicide, a belief confirmed by the findings of the inquest.

=== Treason Trial: 1985–1986 ===
In 1985, Njikelana and three SAAWU colleagues, along with another 12 UDF-affiliated activists, were charged with treason in the highly publicised Pietermaritzburg Treason Trial, heard in the Supreme Court Natal Division. Although most of the defendants were freed in December that year, the trial of the SAAWU defendants continued until June 1986, when the charges against them were dropped abruptly.

In 1987, SAAWU merged into the new National Education, Health and Allied Workers' Union (NEHAWU). Njikelana later served as NEHAWU's general secretary.

== Post-apartheid political career ==
After the end of apartheid, Njikelana represented the African National Congress (ANC) as a local councillor in the City of Johannesburg's Eastern Metropolitan Council from 1995 to 1998; he was assigned to the municipality's urban planning and development portfolio. He was also a member of the executive of the ANC's branches in Hillbrow, Sunnyside, and Yeoville, and he was a member of the South African Communist Party.

In the 2004 general election, he was elected to represent the ANC in the Gauteng constituency of the National Assembly. He was re-elected in 2009 from the national party list, and during his second term, he chaired the Portfolio Committee on Energy. In addition, in 2009, the ANC nominated him to serve in the Pan African Parliament. Although he stood for election to a third term in the National Assembly 2014, he did not win a seat.

== Career in business ==
After leaving Parliament, Njikelana became a businessman and consultant in the energy sector. From 2015 to 2018, he was a research fellow at the University of Johannesburg's Centre for Competition, Regulation and Economic Development, and he is a former chairperson of the South African Independent Power Producers Association.
