= John Milne (judge) =

South African judge (1929–1993)

The Honourable John Milne SC

Supreme Court Justice
- In office January 1988 – 17 December 1993
- Division: Appellate Division
- In office March 1971 – December 1987
- Division: Natal Provincial Division

Judge President of the Natal Provincial Division of the Supreme Court
- In office October 1982 – December 1987
- Preceded by: Neville James
- Succeeded by: Allan Howard

Personal details
- Born: Alexander John Milne; 18 December 1929 Pietermaritzburg, Natal Province; Union of South Africa
- Died: 17 December 1993 (aged 63) England
- Spouse: Shirley Milne (m. 1953)
- Parent: Alexander Milne
- Education: Hilton College
- Alma mater: Rhodes University; Exeter College, Oxford

Alexander John Milne, SC (18 December 1929 – 17 December 1993) was a South African judge from Natal Province. He was Judge President of the Natal Provincial Division of the Supreme Court of South Africa from 1982 to 1987. During that time, he was reputed as a liberal judge on the basis of his judgements in the Pietermaritzburg Treason Trial and other cases involving anti-apartheid protest. He joined the Natal Division in 1971, was promoted to the Appellate Division in 1988, and served on the latter bench until his death in 1993.

== Early life and education ==
Milne was born on 18 December 1929 in Pietermaritzburg in the former Natal Province. His father, Alexander "Sandy" Milne, was at the time a member of the Natal Bar; he was later a judge of the Natal Provincial Division and its Judge President from 1962 to 1969. Milne matriculated at Hilton College in 1946 and took a law BA at Rhodes University, with distinction in Roman law, in 1949. He went on to read jurisprudence at Exeter College, Oxford, where he graduated with first-class honours in 1952.

== Legal career ==
Upon returning to South Africa, Milne read in chambers with Charles Warner QC, and he was admitted as an advocate of the Natal Provincial Division, on 12 June 1953. After 12 years of junior practice, he took silk in April 1965. During his brief practice as senior counsel, he led evidence for the state in the James Commission of Inquiry into municipal irregularities in Natal, and also represented the state in a related criminal trial. In 1968, he acted on the bench in the Natal Division, then led by his father, for the first time.

== Natal Provincial Division: 1971–1988 ==
In March 1971, Milne was appointed permanently as a judge of the Natal Division. After just over a decade on the Natal bench, in September 1981, he was promoted to the newly created post of Deputy Judge President of the Natal Division; and in October the following year, he succeeded Neville James as Judge President of the division, the post formerly held by his father. He remained in office as Judge President until December 1987.

=== Apartheid security laws ===
Milne presided at the height of apartheid in South Africa, marked by the widespread application of the Internal Security Act of 1982 and by several states of emergency imposed in the mid-1980s. In this context, the Natal Division under Milne was regarded as the most liberal bench in the country, and Milne himself – with Michael Corbett, John Didcott, and others – was regarded personally as maintaining "the minority position of ameliorist sensitivity to liberty wherever possible", both in his decisions and in his out-of-court statements.

One of the miracles of the 1990–1993 transitional process is the acceptance of an enhanced role for judges under the new Constitution. Many individuals and factors have contributed to this. But John Milne's contribution must surely rank among the greatest. As a judge, and particularly as Judge President of the Natal Provincial Division, he showed that law and justice are inseparable and that the institutions of the law can survive only if they take account of this truth... [H]e has left lawyers a rich legacy – an example of judicial courage and leadership in the promotion of human rights.

— Obituary by John Dugard, 1994

For one example, in August 1985, during the civil unrest that surrounded the Vaal uprising, Milne urged in a speech in Durban that politicians should prioritise the development of a bill of rights, so that judges could play an active role in establishing fairness and equity. The following month, he issued an order instructing the South African Police to desist assaulting and imposing pressure on a political detainee, Billy Nair of the anti-apartheid United Democratic Front; Milne said that assaults in police custody constituted "a state of affairs which no civilised nation, particularly one which professes to follow Christian principles, could tolerate for one moment". Dhaya Pillay, at the time an activist lawyer, later said that Milne had personally intervened to ensure that political detainees held under the state of emergency had access to lawyers and family visits. On one occasion, he intervened in the case of Yusuf Vawda, a human rights lawyer held incommunicado under security laws, by sending Judge Brian Galgut to visit the cells; according to Pillay, the move "revitalised" the detainees' faith in "the rule of law, enforced by trustworthy, independent and impartial judiciary".

Then, in August 1986, the Natal Division, led by Milne, declared as invalid two key provisions in the prevailing state-of-emergency regulations – those empowering indiscriminate arrest without warrant and indefinite detention without trial – and thereby invalidated all ongoing emergency detentions in Natal. Milne said that State President P. W. Botha had exceeded his legal authority in proclaiming the regulations. In general, by March 1987, academic John Dugard observed that the Natal Division had "acquired a new reputation for judicial independence in matters affecting race and security" since Milne's appointment as Judge President. According to Dugard, "The renaissance of justice in Natal was widely acclaimed and Natal became a favourite forum for human rights litigation."

=== Pietermaritzburg Treason Trial ===
Also in 1985–1986, Milne presided in the high-profile Pietermaritzburg Treason Trial, which ended in the acquittal of 16 prominent United Democratic Front activists. The state dropped the charges against the final defendants after Milne's ruling in S v Ramgobin and Others (1986), which held that videotape recordings (in this case, recordings of political speeches) were admissible evidence only if it was proven that they were original recordings and that there existed no reasonable possibility of interference with them; the judgement remains authoritative in South African law of evidence. Dhaya Pillay said of the judgement:

Judges with conscience and imagination, conscientious and clever judges will strive to find appropriate rules of law to apply to circumstances of a case to achieve justice. Judge Milne had been appointed by an apartheid president. However, as a legal scholar, law meant justice to him. By applying a technical rule of law on evidence, he directly raised the standard of proof prosecutors must produce before the burden shifts to the accused to defend themselves; indirectly, he gave effect to the right to freedom of expression in politics. Judges like John Milne are respected, remembered and loved. Good judges turn the tide of strife towards democracy.

A month after the judgement, in July 1986, Dugard told the New York Times that Milne's conduct in the Pietermaritzburg trial and other such cases was among several factors that was inspiring increasing judicial confidence and a willingness to challenge executive actions.

== Appellate Division: 1988–1993 ==
Milne left the Natal Division in order to take up appointment as a junior judge of appeal on South Africa's highest court, the Appellate Division in Bloemfontein, where he began work in early 1988. According to Michael Corbett, Milne said that his initial inclination was to decline the promotion but that he had accepted out of a reluctance to "put personal convenience before duty".

In 1993, Milne led the one-man Milne Commission into the Granting of Certain Powers to Legal Practitioners and Related Matters, a judicial inquiry appointed by the General Council of the Bar and tasked primarily with making recommendations about attorneys' rights of audience in the Supreme Court. However, David Dyzenhaus later suggested that the Chief Justice "carefully kept him (and other untrustworthy judges) off panels that decided public law issues to do with resistance to apartheid", so that his promotion "both weakened the Natal Bench and had no impact on the Appellate Division". Nonetheless, according to Dugard, Milne was "expected to play a major role" in the post-apartheid order; negotiations over South Africa's Interim Constitution were completed shortly before Milne's death.

== Personal life and death ==
Milne met his wife, Shirley, at Rhodes University, and they married in July 1953. He was involved in the administration of competitive fly-fishing in Natal and also served on the Natal Parks Board.

He died unexpectedly in office on 17 December 1993, the day before his 64th birthday, while motoring in the English countryside on a holiday with his wife and son.

== See also ==
- Apartheid legislation
