= Kesaveloo Goonam =

South African doctor and anti-apartheid activist

Personal details
- Born: Kesaveloo Goonaruthnum Naidoo; 1906 May Street, Durban
- Died: 21 September 1998 (aged 92)
- Children: 3
- Education: Edinburgh University

Kesaveloo Goonam, also known as Kesaveloo Goonaruthnum Naidoo (1906–1998) was a South African doctor and anti-apartheid activist. She was also called "Coolie Doctor", which became the title of her 1991 autobiography.

== Early life and education ==
Kesaveloo Goonaruthnum Naidoo was born in May Street, Durban. Her mother Thangatchee Naidoo was from Mauritius, and her father R. K. Naidoo was born in India. She was attending Tamil school Sathia Gnama Sabbaiat, but also attended an English-speaking school. Her parents' social circles meant that she met Mohandas K. Gandhi, Annie Besant, Strinivasa Sastri, M.L Sultan and Monty Naicker and others as a girl. She went to medical school on Scotland at the University of Edinburgh on 8 March 1928, and returned with her degree to South Africa in 1936 to set up medical practice in Grey Street. She was the first Indian woman doctor in South Africa.

== Career ==
At first, she met racial discrimination, which denied her entry for hospital posts caused by white nurses refusal to take orders from an Indian doctor. She established a medical practice among black and Asian women in Durban, who learned that "Dr. Goonam" would meet their needs, especially for reproductive healthcare, with understanding and discretion.

She became involved with organisations like Child Welfare and Friends of The Sick Association (FOSA). In 1939, she becomes vice-chairperson of Non-Europe United which was established in Natal. She was also active with the Natal Indian Congress, and was elected as the vice president and later became acting president. She became the committee member of The Anti Segregation Council (ASC), with Monty Naicker as chairman which was formed to oppose voluntary segregation on 28 April 1944.

On the Indian Passive Resistance Campaign 1946 which opposed Asiatic Land Tenure and Indian Representation Act, 1946, she becomes the leader of the march for the third day of the campaign with Rev Michael Scott. She became one of the volunteers to be court imprisoned and in one of her court said, "I plead guilty and ask the court to impose the maximum sentence permitted by law. ..... In occupying the resistance camp I was protesting against that oppressive and pernicious law recently enacted against my people who had no part in framing it. The Act spells disaster, ruin and a state of semi-serfdom to our people who contributed greatly to the prosperity of this country. South Africa we are reminded frequently, is a democratic country.... I am here to vindicate this interpretation of democracy". On 29 June 1946, Dr. Goonam was sentenced for six months with seven days hard labour, in addition to seven days hard labour suspended for three months which she had been sentenced to under the Riotous Assemblies Act on 25 June 1946. However, after four months the sentence was suspended. Goonam has been imprisoned 17 times caused of her political activities. During the 1950s, she helped India's deputy health minister and Sushila Nayyar to supervise family planning programmes as a government committee on New Delhi.

Her political activities continued, including hosting meetings of the in her medical offices in 1961 with Theo Kloppenberg, Eleanor Kasrils, Poomoney Moodley. She left South Africa for England in 1978 to escape harassment from security officer for her own safety. Before she left, she founded Helping Hand Society to help family which was cast away from Clairwood and Cato Manor into Chatsworth. She continued to practice medicine for Indian refugees from Uganda and Kenya, before moving to Australia and Zimbabwe. She returned to South Africa in 1990, after Nelson Mandela was released from prison. She voted in the 1994 South African elections. Also in 1994, she called for the disbanding of the Natal Indian Congress, saying "now is the time to go."

She published her autobiography, Coolie Doctor, in 1991.

== Personal life and legacy ==
She had three children and became a single mother. Kesaveloo Goonam died on 21 September 1998, aged 92 years.

A street in the Durban Central Business District, Dr Goonam Street, was renamed after her in 2008.

On 1 July 2016, Sastri College Alumni Association held a memorable commemoration of the Passive Resistance Campaign 1946 and plant a tree in honour of her at the Resistance Park in Durban.

In 2019, The University of Edinburgh School of Social and Political Sciences elected to name a newly created PhD building after Dr Goonam in George Square.
