= Ismail Mohamed (mathematician) =

South African activist and mathematician (1930–2013)

Ismail Mohamed OMS
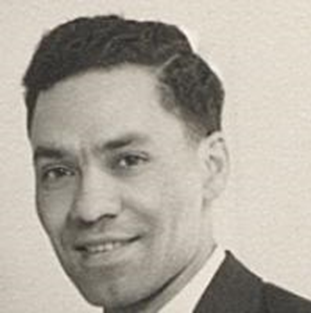

Member of the National Assembly
- In office May 1994 – May 2009

Personal details
- Born: 27 July 1930 Barkly East, Cape Province; Union of South Africa
- Died: 6 July 2013 (aged 82)
- Party: African National Congress
- Spouse: Ellen Mohamed (m. 1959)

Academic background
- Education: University of the Witwatersrand; Queen Mary College, University of London (PhD)
- Thesis: On series of subgroups related to groups of automorphisms (1960)
- Doctoral advisor: Kurt Hirsch

Academic work
- Discipline: Mathematics
- Sub-discipline: Group theory
- Notable ideas: Heineken-Mohamed groups

Ismail Jacobus Mohamed (27 July 1930 – 6 July 2013) was a South African activist and mathematician. He represented the African National Congress (ANC) in the National Assembly from 1994 to 2009.

Long associated with the University of the Witwatersrand, Mohamed was best known academically for his work in group theory, including his work on Heineken-Mohamed groups with Hermann Heineken. At the same time, he was a labour and anti-apartheid activist from the 1950s onwards, and he was a leading figure in the Non-European Unity Movement, the Transvaal Indian Congress, and the United Democratic Front in the former Transvaal. Between stints in universities abroad, he was a defendant in the Pietermaritzburg Treason Trial of 1985. Both for his political activism and his academic achievement, he was admitted posthumously to the Order of Mapungubwe in 2014.

== Early life and education ==
Mohamed was born on 27 July 1930 in Barkly East in the former Cape Province. His parents separated when he was four years old and he was raised by his mother, Rose Fortuin, who worked as a domestic worker and machinist in a clothing factory.

When Mohamed was about 11, they moved to Aliwal North, where he attended St Joseph's College – a Catholic school, although his mother was a devout member of the Dutch Reformed Mission Church – and contracted a serious case of enteric fever. In 1944, he moved to Johannesburg with his mother. While attending high school, he did part-time domestic work to supplement his mother's income. After he matriculated in 1949, he took up a job as a dish washer on the railways until he was awarded a bursary that would cover his university tuition.

In 1951, Mohamed enrolled at the University of the Witwatersrand (Wits), where he read mathematics and physics. After finishing his first-class honours degree in maths in 1954, he taught in a high school in Reiger Park while working part-time on his master's degree at Wits. During this period, Mohamed became increasingly politically engaged, due largely to the influence of his mother, who had joined the Garment Workers' Union. Mohamed joined the Non-European Unity Movement (NEUM) and was increasingly won over by socialism; he volunteered during the 1957 Alexandra bus boycott, as well as in more routine union organising in Johannesburg.

== Academic career and activism ==
=== England: 1957–1965 ===
From 1957 to 1960, he read for his PhD in maths at Queen Mary College, University of London, where his supervisor was renowned group theorist Kurt Hirsch. While working on his research, Mohamed was an assistant lecturer at the University College of Wales in Cardiff. After he completed his dissertation in 1960, he was appointed as an assistant lecturer at Queen Mary. However, he and his family returned to South Africa between 1961 and 1964; Mohamed lectured in the maths faculty at Wits and continued his activism with the NEUM, but he found his professional life restrained by heightened political repression and the Bantu Education Act. He returned to England in 1964 and lectured at Birkbeck College for a year.

=== Southern Africa: 1965–1975 ===
Mohamed left Birkbeck to take up a post as senior lecturer at the newly established University of Lusaka. While in newly independent Zambia, he also advised the Ministry of Education on skills development. In 1968, he moved to Roma, Lesotho, to become a senior lecturer at the University of Botswana, Lesotho and Swaziland. While there, Mohamed was promoted swiftly through the ranks of the maths department and completed his best known research with Hermann Heineken. Joint work by Mohamed and Heineken resolved several important problems in group theory and devised what are now known as Heineken-Mohamed groups.

=== Return to South Africa: 1975–1994 ===
In 1975, Mohamed accepted an invitation to join the maths faculty at the University of the Western Cape. In the aftermath of the 1976 Soweto uprising, he was arrested under the Internal Security Act and was detained without trial for three-and-a-half months for his political activity. After he was released, he was fired by the university. He returned to Wits as a lecturer in 1977 and remained there for the next decade, becoming associate professor in 1983 and later full professor.

While in Johannesburg, Mohamed was closely involved in the relaunch of the Transvaal Indian Congress and launch of the United Democratic Front (UDF) in 1983. In February 1985, he was arrested in a raid in Johannesburg, and he became one of 16 UDF leaders charged with treason in the ensuing Pietermaritzburg Treason Trial. The charges against him were dropped in December 1985, but Mohamed and his family left South Africa for exile in January 1987. While abroad that year, he remained a vocal opponent of apartheid, and he gave a speech on the subject at the National Academy of Sciences in Washington D. C. He returned to South Africa in September 1987 and was elected vice-president of the Transvaal branch of the UDF.

== Parliament: 1994–2009 ==
In South Africa's first post-apartheid elections in 1994, Mohamed was elected to represent the African National Congress in the National Assembly, the lower house of the new South African Parliament. He served three terms in his seat – excepting a brief hiatus after the 1999 general election – and retired after the 2009 general election.

== Personal life and death ==
In 1959 in London, Mohamed married Ellen Rygaart, his former pupil in Reiger Park. They had five children together. He died on 6 July 2013 after a long illness. President Jacob Zuma provided a eulogy at his funeral, which was held in Coronationville.

== Honours ==
Mohamed received an honorary doctorate of law from Wits and an honorary doctorate of science from the University of Lesotho; his wife accepted the latter on his behalf in 1985, while he was on trial for treason. In April 2014, he was posthumously awarded the Order of Mapungubwe in silver, for "his excellent contribution to the field of Mathematics and political liberation".
