= Yusuf Cachalia =

South African activist (1915–1995)

- Born: Yusuf Mohamed Cachalia; 15 January 1915; Johannesburg, Transvaal, Union of South Africa
- Died: 9 April 1995 (aged 80); Johannesburg, South Africa
- Movement: Transvaal Indian Congress; South African Indian Congress
- Spouses: Bettie du Toit (divorced) Amina Cachalia (m. 1955)
- Children: 3, including Ghaleb Cachalia
- Father: A. M. Cachalia
- Relatives: Moulvi Cachalia (brother)

Yusuf Mohamed Cachalia (15 January 1915 – 9 April 1995) was a South African anti-apartheid activist. He was the secretary of the South African Indian Congress, in which capacity he played a central role in organising the 1952 Defiance Campaign.

== Early life and education ==
Cachalia was born on 15 January 1915 in Johannesburg. His father, A. M. (Ahmed Mohamed) Cachalia, was a politically active Indian: he was a close ally to Mohandas Gandhi and had served as president of the Transvaal British Indian Association. Cachalia himself left South Africa between 1936 and 1941 to study Islamic philosophy in India.

== Activism and career ==
Upon his return to South Africa, Cachalia became an influential figure in the Transvaal Indian Congress (TIC) and South African Indian Congress (SAIC), ultimately serving as secretary of the SAIC. He was known for his "eclectic" personal political philosophy, which combined orthodox Islamic thought with Gandhian philosophy and Marxism. He was viewed as an ally of Yusuf Dadoo, who was credited with effecting a left-wing putsch in the Indian Congresses, as well as an ally of Nelson Mandela. Like Dadoo and Mandela, he was an advocate for closer cooperation between Indians and black Africans.

Cachalia represented the SAIC on the joint planning council that organised the non-racial 1952 Defiance Campaign, and in December 1952 he was among the activists convicted for their role in planning the campaign. The following year, he was issued with a strict banning order, which thereafter was renewed several times; between 1963 and 1973, he was not only banned but confined to effective house arrest in Fordsburg. Despite his ban, he was a member of the committee that drafted the Freedom Charter in 1955. His banning orders expired in 1977 and resumed his activism.

He died at his home in Johannesburg on 9 April 1995, less than a year after the end of apartheid. Mandela, by then serving as President of South Africa, described his death as a "great personal blow".

== Personal life ==
Cachalia was Muslim. Joe Matthews later said that he was known for being, with Mandela, one of "the two best-dressed chaps in the [anti-apartheid] movement".

Cachalia had two sons and a daughter from two marriages. His first wife was Bettie du Toit, a white Afrikaner. In July 1955, he remarried to Amina Asvat, the daughter of another Gandhi ally, Ebrahim Asvat. In her 2013 memoirs, Asvat alleged that some of Cachalia's friends disapproved of their marriage, leading to rifts between Cachalia and his elder brother, Moulvi, and between Cachalia and Ahmed Kathrada. Nonetheless, Asvat said that Cachalia was "a liberated husband. He always let me do exactly what I felt necessary." Their two children are Coco, a media personality, and Ghaleb, a politician.
