= Essop Jassat =

South African activist and politician (born 1932)

Essop Jassat OLS

Member of the National Assembly
- In office May 1994 – April 2004

Personal details
- Born: 5 October 1932 (age 93) Vrededorp, Transvaal; Union of South Africa
- Party: African National Congress
- Other political affiliations: Transvaal Indian Congress
- Education: Wits University (MBChB)

Essop Essak Jassat (born 5 October 1932) is a retired South African politician and medical doctor who represented the African National Congress (ANC) in the National Assembly from 1994 to 2004. He is a former anti-apartheid activist and a former president of the Transvaal Indian Congress.

== Early life and activism ==
Jassat was born on 5 October 1932 in Vrededorp, Johannesburg in the former Transvaal. He was the second of three children and both of his parents were immigrants from India. He completed his MBChB at Wits University in 1960.

By that time, Jassat was active in the anti-apartheid movement; he had joined the youth wing of the Transvaal Indian Congress in 1947, become its chairperson, and represented it at the 1955 Congress of the People. Bob Hepple recruited him into an underground sabotage unit, and a back room in his surgery in Johannesburg was used by Umkhonto we Sizwe (MK) operatives for storing sabotage materials. He also provided medical treatment to the MK high command at Liliesleaf Farm in the weeks before their arrest in 1963. He was placed under his first banning order in 1955, and in 1964 he served ten days in prison after being convicted of failing to comply with the conditions of the ban.

When the Transvaal Indian Congress was relaunched in 1983, Jassat became its president. In the same year, he joined the United Democratic Front (UDF). In 1984–85, he was among the 16 UDF leaders, including Albertina Sisulu and Archie Gumede, who were charged (and then acquitted) of treason in the Pietermaritzburg Treason Trial. During the democratic transition, he represented the Transvaal Indian Congress at the Convention for a Democratic South Africa.

== Post-apartheid career ==
In the 1994 general election, South Africa's first under universal suffrage, Jassat was elected to represent the African National Congress (ANC) in the National Assembly, the lower house of the new South African Parliament. He remained in his seat until the 2004 general election, gaining re-election in 1999.

After leaving Parliament, he returned to his medical practice in Fordsburg until he retired in 2017. During that time, in 2015, President Jacob Zuma awarded him the Order of Luthuli in silver "for his excellent contribution to the struggle for liberation and advancing democracy in South Africa, through selfless sacrifice without regard for his own safety and wellbeing". In 2018, the ANC appointed him to its internal Integrity Commission, then led by George Mashamba.

== Personal life ==
He married Shireen Patel in 1964. They have a son and two daughters.
