= Aubrey Mokoena =

South African politician (1948–2021)

Member of the National Assembly
- In office 26 November 2009 – 6 May 2014
- Constituency: Gauteng
- In office May 1994 – April 2009
- Constituency: Gauteng

Personal details
- Born: 12 April 1948 Orlando West, Transvaal; Union of South Africa
- Died: 12 July 2021 (aged 73)
- Party: African National Congress
- Education: University of the North; University of South Africa

Aubrey Dundubela Mokoena (12 April 1948 – 12 July 2021) was a South African politician and former anti-apartheid activist. He represented the African National Congress (ANC) in the National Assembly from 1994 to 2014, excepting a brief hiatus in 2009. He served the Gauteng constituency and chaired the Portfolio Committee on Home Affairs from 1999 to 2002.

Born in Soweto, Mokoena rose to prominence during apartheid as a Black Consciousness activist at Turfloop, where he was a leader in the South African Students' Organisation and student representative council during the student protests of 1972. During the 1980s, he became involved in the United Democratic Front of the Southern Transvaal, in which capacity he was a leading member of the Release Mandela campaign and Winnie Mandela Crisis Committee. He was also a defendant in the Pietermaritzburg Treason Trial of 1985.

== Early life ==
Mokoena was born on 12 April 1948 in Orlando West, a township outside Johannesburg that soon became part of Soweto. His parents were from the Orange Free State but had moved to the Johannesburg area to find work, and they were homeless for a period until they found accommodation in a new settlement founded by James Mpanza. Because his mother was ill, Mokoena was partly raised by a family friend, Anna Khomo. His father, Steven Mokoena, was a dedicated member both of the African Methodist Episcopal Church and of the African National Congress (ANC), and the family participated both in school boycotts – after the introduction of the apartheid-era Bantu Education system – and in the potato boycott.

== Anti-apartheid activism ==
=== Black Consciousness ===
After matriculating, Mokoena got a job teaching at his former high school until 1970, when he was awarded a bursary to enrol at the University of the North at Turfloop. At Turfloop, he became active in the burgeoning Black Consciousness movement, chairing the local branches of the South African Students' Organisation (SASO) and Students' Christian Movement. He was also vice president of Turfloop's student representative council, deputising Onkgopotse Tiro. In 1972, he succeeded Tiro as president and in that capacity invited Tiro to make a speech at the annual graduation ceremony. The speech, a strong renunciation of apartheid and Bantu Education, led to Tiro's expulsion from Turfloop, in turn the stimulus for nationwide student protests which reinvigorated the students' movement and Black Consciousness movement.

Mokoena was expelled from Turfloop as a result of the protests but enrolled at the University of South Africa to continue his degree. He also became head of the Transvaal section of the Black Community Programmes, the community outreach arm of the Black People's Convention. In September 1974, the apartheid government inaugurated a crackdown on Black Consciousness organisations in the aftermath of pro-FRELIMO rallies organised by SASO to celebrate Mozambican independence; Mokoena was detained in the immediate aftermath of the rallies and held for nine months without charge. On so-called "Black Wednesday" in October 1977, in the aftermath of the Soweto uprising, he was detained again, and upon his release his political activities remained constrained by a banning order.

=== Congress movement ===
On Black Wednesday, the government had also banned 18 Black Consciousness organisations, including SASO and the Black People's Convention. Upon the expiry of his banning order in 1983, Mokoena did not join the new generation of Black Consciousness organisations but instead became involved in the leadership of the United Democratic Front (UDF), which was aligned to the exiled ANC. Following a protest against the new Tricameral Parliament in 1984, he and fifteen others were detained and charged with treason in the Pietermaritzburg Treason Trial. The trial began in 1985 and lasted until December of that year, when the charges against him were dropped. Mokoena was nonetheless arrested again in March 1986 – in the middle of a press conference about an arson attack at the Johannesburg offices of the Release Mandela Committee – and upon his release was served with another banning order.

In between and after his periods in detention, Mokoena was a leading member of the UDF's Release Mandela campaign, advocating nationally and internationally for the release of Nelson Mandela, and, in 1988, he was a leading member of the Mandela 70 Committee, elected to organise a "concert for peace" in Johannesburg to celebrate Mandela's seventieth birthday (the local iteration of London's Free Nelson Mandela Concert). In 1988, he became a member of the Winnie Mandela Crisis Committee, formed in Soweto by the UDF to manage the chaos sown by Winnie Mandela's Football Club and the related reputational fallout; he later appeared before the Truth and Reconciliation Commission to testify about the committee's activities. He formally joined the ANC after it was unbanned in 1990 during the negotiations to end apartheid.

== Parliament: 1994–2014 ==
In South Africa's first post-apartheid elections in 1994, Mokoena was elected to represent the ANC in the National Assembly, the lower house of the new South African Parliament. He was re-elected in 1999 and 2004 and served the Gauteng constituency. For part of his first term in the assembly, he served as chairperson of committees, but he was best known for his tenure as chairman of the Portfolio Committee on Home Affairs from 1999 to 2002.

His tenure in the chair in September 1999 began inauspiciously, with the opposition Democratic Party calling for him to step down to avoid a conflict of interest: he was also chairman of a black empowerment consortium, Rainbow, which, with Concor, had recently won a state contract to build a prison near Kokstad. In subsequent years, the committee was preoccupied with the processing of the Immigration Bill. Mokoena, whom the Mail & Guardian described as an "autocratic and obstructive" chairman, was blamed by critics for delays in processing the bill, and the ANC faced increasing pressure from opposition parties to replace him. In 2002, the party announced that it would nominate Mpho Scott to replace Mokoena as chairman from 1 May, with Mokoena relegated to the backbenches.

Mokoena was briefly absent from the National Assembly after the 2009 general election, in which he failed to secure re-election. However, he returned not long into the legislative term, in late November 2009, when he was sworn in to fill the casual vacancy that arose in the Gauteng caucus after Frans Masango died. He left the National Assembly permanently after the 2014 general election.

== Death ==
He was formerly married to Mally Mokoena, they later got divorced. They had two children: Mandela Motheo Mokoena, born in 1979, and Naledina Mokoena, born in 1986. His firstborn son was named Mandela, a name that was banned at the time. Due to fear of political repercussions, the nurses were reluctant to record the name on the birth certificate, fearing arrest. The name "Mandela" was chosen in honor of former President Nelson Mandela, who served as a significant source of inspiration. His son was named Mandela in alignment with his political activism, particularly his role in the Release Mandela Campaign. In October 1999, he was hijacked outside his home in Orlando East, Soweto. He died on 12 July 2021 from COVID19. His passing was a profound loss to all those whose lives he touched. He was instrumental in establishing a church, generously contributed to those in need, and, in his later years, gradually withdrew from public and political life.
