= Sonny Venkatrathnam =

South African human rights activist (1935–2019)

- Born: 27 July 1935; Durban, Natal
- Died: 15 March 2019 (aged 83); Durban, Natal
- Occupation: Human rights activist

Sonny Venkatrathnam (27 July 1935 – 15 March 2019) was a South African anti-apartheid activist and human rights activist who was imprisoned in the Robben Island Maximum Security Prison along with other anti-apartheid activists including Nelson Mandela, Govan Mbeki, and Mac Maharaj. He was most famously known for smuggling an edition of The Complete Works of William Shakespeare into the prison. The book was shared with many of the high-profile prisoners in the prison and was called the Robben Island Bible.

== Early life ==
Venkatrathnam was born in Sea View in Durban in the province of Natal, on 27 July 1935, in a family with 12 siblings. His grandparents were bonded laborers who had come in from India. His parents were flower sellers in the Durban cemetery, and later farmers in Cliffdale near Pietermaritzburg. He grew up in the family with modest means, with no electricity or running water at home.

His schooling was interrupted during the Second World War and when it resumed, his siblings and he had to travel seven miles crossing the Umbilo river to get to school in Stella Hill. After completing his school, he went to high school at Sastri College, the only high school that was open for students of Indian origin at the time. After his high school, he joined the Natal University for a Bachelor of Arts degree, but, had to attend college in the evenings outside of campus because the college would not admit black students into the campus. The student study group there later became a student organization, The Durban Students Union.

== Career and activism ==
Venkatrathnam was an anti-apartheid activist who was held a prisoner at the Robben Island Maximum Security Prison. He was most famously known for smuggling an edition of The Complete Works of William Shakespeare into the prison. The book was passed around to other prisoners including Nelson Mandela, Walter Sisulu, Govan Mbeki, Billy Nair, Raymond Mhlaba, and Mac Maharaj. To avoid identification and being confiscated, he had covered the book with old Deepavali greeting cards. The book went on to be known as the Robben Island Bible.

Whilst serving two concurrent six-year terms at the prison, due to torture, he became deaf in one ear and suffered a burst hernia.

He worked with Amnesty International after his ban was lifted in April 1983. As a human rights activist he organized the Human Rights Now! concerts in 1988 to spread awareness of the Universal Declaration of Human Rights on its 40th anniversary. The worldwide concert tour had featured singers including Bruce Springsteen, Sting, Tracy Chapman, Peter Gabriel, and Youssou N'Dour.

Venkatrathnam lived in Durban for most of his life. He taught at the University of Durban-Westville through the 1990s.

== Personal life ==
Venkatrathnam died on 15 March 2019. He was aged 84.

== Books ==
- Hahn, Matthew (2017). The Robben Island Shakespeare. John Kani, John Battersby. London. ISBN 978-1-4742-8387-8. OCLC 969969464.
- Ashwin., Desai (2014). Reading revolution : Shakespeare on Robben island. Haymarket Books. ISBN 978-1-60846-272-8. OCLC 971189117.

== Additional Reading ==
- Sonny Venkatrathnam at the South African History Online
