= South African Indian Congress =

South African organisation

- President: Umar Hajee Ahmed Jhaveri
- Founded: 1921
- Merger of: Natal Indian Congress; Transvaal British Indian Association; Cape British Indian Council
- Ideology: Indian interests Gandhism; Anti-racism; Anti-Apartheid; Anti-imperialism; Socialism; Hindu-Muslim unity
- Political position: Left-wing
- Religion: Hinduism, Islam
- National affiliation: Congress Alliance (1950s)

The South African Indian Congress (SAIC) was an umbrella body founded in 1921 to coordinate between political organisations representing Indians in the various provinces of South Africa. Its members were the Natal Indian Congress (NIC), the Transvaal Indian Congress (TIC), and, initially, the Cape British Indian Council. It advocated non-violent resistance to discriminatory laws and in its formative years was strongly influenced by the NIC's founder, Mahatma Gandhi.

Although the SAIC's members operated with a great deal of autonomy, the SAIC had a particularly important political role in the 1950s, when it represented the NIC and TIC in fostering more cooperative relations with the African National Congress. Pursuant to these efforts, the SAIC co-organised the Defiance Campaign and Congress of the People, and it became a signatory to the Freedom Charter and a member of the Congress Alliance.

== Origins ==
The three affiliates of the South African Indian Congress (SAIC) were the Natal Indian Congress (NIC), the Transvaal British Indian Association (later the Transvaal Indian Congress, TIC), and, during the congress's formative years, the Cape British Indian Council (CBIC). Each of the three affiliates preceded SAIC, in the NIC's case by almost three decades. The CBIC had called repeatedly for a national conference of Indian organisations in 1917 and 1918, and such a conference was finally in the last week of January 1919 in Cape Town. The conference was opened with a speech by J. X. Merriman on 26 January. Another national conference was held in 1920 and, at the third in 1921, it was decided formally to establish the SAIC as an umbrella body. Umar Hajee Ahmed Jhaveri was elected inaugural president of the SAIC.

Over the next decade, the SAIC, like its affiliates, was a moderate and even conservative body; dominated by an elite class of South African Indians, its primary methods were petitions, deputations to the authorities, and appeals for help to the government of India, then under British control. However, during the 1930s, the incumbent leadership was challenged by a group of younger activists, labelled radicals, who advocated for a more militant form of non-violent resistance to racist laws, as well as for cooperation with South Africa's black African majority. Their influence grew until 1945–1946, when two of the radical leaders, Monty Naicker and Yusuf Dadoo, were elected as the leaders of the NIC and TIC respectively.

== Opposition to the Ghetto Act ==
In 1946, the SAIC, with Mahatma Gandhi's support, resolved to protest the Asiatic Land Tenure and Indian Representation Act, which it nicknamed the Ghetto Act. The NIC and TIC each established ad hoc committees – the NIC in March and the TIC in April – which organised a campaign of passive resistance against the law. The campaign continued for two years, from June 1946 to June 1948, and involved the arrest of almost 2,000 protestors. At the height of the campaign, the Indian government took up the SAIC's complaints in the General Assembly of the United Nations; a SAIC delegation travelled to New York to advise the effort. The Indian resolution was passed in December 1946. Also during the course of the passive resistance campaign, in March 1947, the respective presidents of the two provincial congresses – Dadoo for the TIC and Naicker for the NIC – signed a joint declaration of co-operation with Alfred Xuma, the leader of the African National Congress (ANC). The document, nicknamed the Doctors' Pact because all three signatories were doctors, pledged "the fullest co-operation between the [black] African and Indian peoples".

== Opposition to apartheid ==
In 1948, the National Party came to power in South Africa on a platform of legislating apartheid; in September that year, Naicker was elected as president of the SAIC. In 1951, the ANC and SAIC jointly planned the 1952 Defiance Campaign, with the SAIC's Yusuf Dadoo and Yusuf Cachalia sitting on the planning council alongside the ANC's James Moroka, Walter Sisulu, and J. B. Marks. On the first day of the campaign on 26 June 1952, the ANC's Walter Sisulu and TIC president Nana Sita led the first group of Johannesburg volunteers to arrest in Boksburg. In 1955, the SAIC, again with the ANC, was involved in organising the Congress of the People, at which it became a signatory of the Freedom Charter and a member of the Congress Alliance. Several members of the SAIC and both of its provincial wings were charged in the Treason Trial that followed the Congress of the People.

== Dormancy ==
From 1960, the apartheid government embarked on an unprecedented programme to repress opposition groups in the aftermath of the 1960 Sharpeville massacre. Though the SAIC and its affiliates were not banned by the government, many of its leading members faced banning orders. Others were imprisoned for their activities in Umkhonto we Sizwe, an armed opposition group, or went into exile abroad to evade police harassment or join the exiled South African Communist Party. The SAIC and its affiliates fell into dormancy.

The NIC was ultimately revived in 1971 and the TIC in 1983, but the umbrella body was not formally revived. The provincial branches continued to work in partnership with each other, as well as independently and as affiliates of the United Democratic Front. Both the NIC and TIC again fell dormant after the end of apartheid in 1994, with most of their leading members joining the ANC.
