= Umar Hajee Ahmed Jhaveri =

Indian South African businessman

Umar Hajee Ahmed Jhaveri was a Memon Indian South African businessman. It was a court case concerning him that brought Mahatma Gandhi to South Africa. Jhaveri was the first president of the South African Indian Congress.
