= Curtis Nkondo =

South African diplomat

Curtis Nkondo (1 February 1928 – 3 December 2009) was a South African diplomat, school teacher and politician with the African National Congress. Born in Louis Trichardt, Nkondo was a lifelong activist with the ANC. He was a high school teacher at Lamula High School in Meadowlands, Gauteng and eventually became the chairman of the Soweto Teachers Action Committee before being suspended for educating against apartheid. A year after the formation of the Azanian People's Organisation (AZAPO) in 1978, in September 1979, at its conference in Roodepoort the national executive was formed with Nkondo as its president. In 1980, Nkondo was suspended by AZAPO for Breach of principle.

In 1983, he became the Vice President of the United Democratic Front coalition.

Nkondo was the chairman of the National Education Union of South Africa and in 1984, he was one of the UDF's leaders that were tried for treason.

In 1985, he served as the chairman of the Release Mandela campaign which advocated for ANC leader Nelson Mandela's release from prison. Following independence, Nkondo became South Africa's High Commissioner in neighboring Namibia.

He died on 3 December 2009.

== Private life ==
He married a nurse, Rose Magros, with whom he had four children.
