= Mewa Ramgobin =

South African politician and activist (1932–2016)

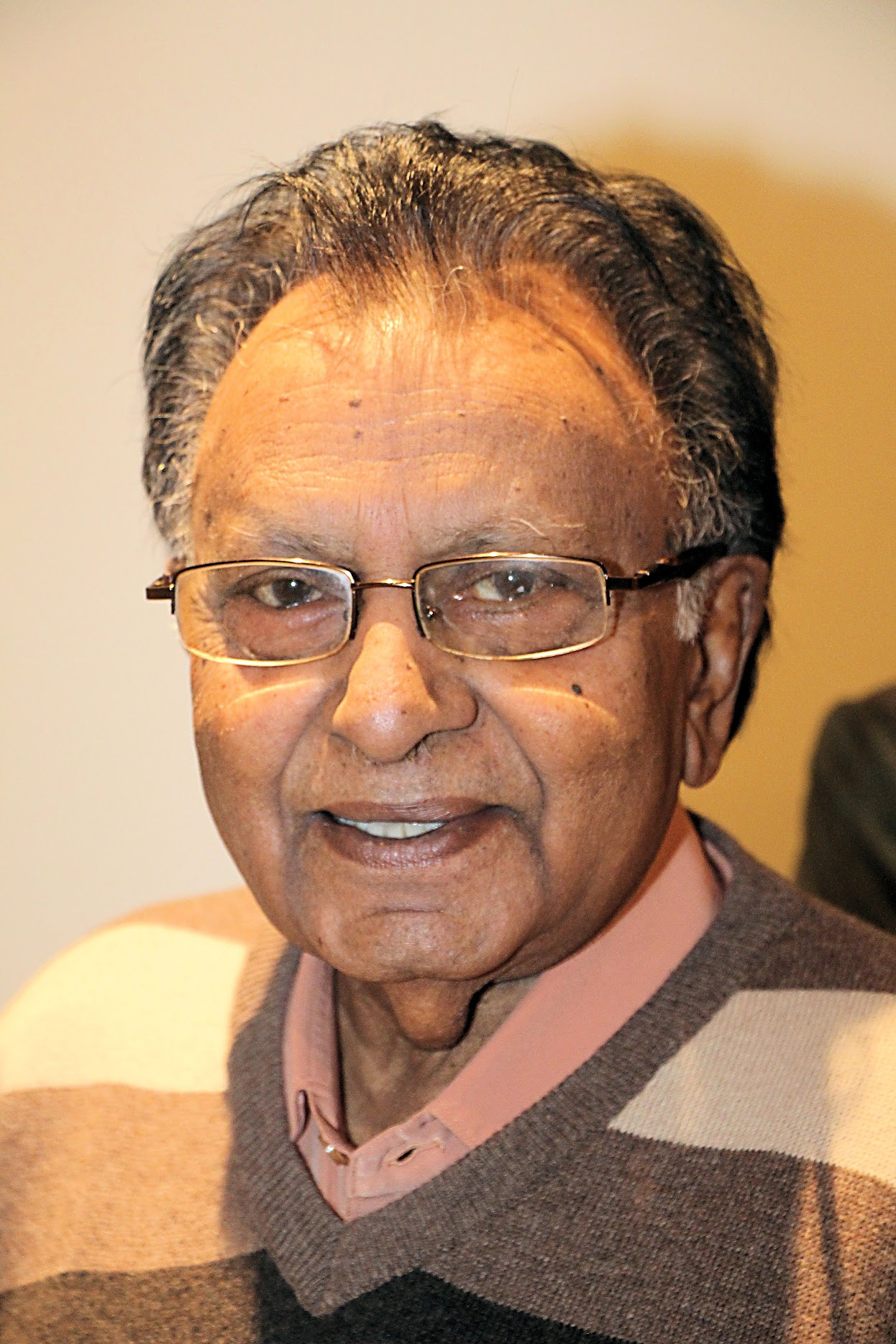

Member of the National Assembly
- In office May 1994 – May 2009

Personal details
- Born: Mawalal Ramgobin; 10 November 1932 Inanda, Natal Province; Union of South Africa
- Died: 17 October 2016 (aged 83) Cape Town, Western Cape; Republic of South Africa
- Party: African National Congress
- Other political affiliations: Natal Indian Congress
- Spouse(s): Mariam Moosagee Amajee Ela Gandhi (m. 1960; div. 1990)
- Children: 6
- Education: University of Natal

Mawalal "Mewa" Ramgobin (10 November 1932 – 17 October 2016) was a South African politician and former anti-apartheid activist. A stalwart of the Natal Indian Congress, he represented the African National Congress (ANC) in the National Assembly from 1994 to 2009.

Born in Inanda and descended from Indian indentured labourers, Ramgobin became a student activist at the University of Natal. With his former wife, Ela Gandhi, he rose to prominence as a political and cultural activist in the Phoenix Settlement in the 1960s. A lifelong Gandhian, he was a central figure in the Natal Indian Congress, which he helped revive in 1971. He was later the founding treasurer of the United Democratic Front and the first accused in the Pietermaritzburg Treason Trial. Between 1965 and 1990, he spent 12 years under house arrest.

After his three terms in the post-apartheid Parliament, Ramgobin retired from active politics in 2009, though he remained active in his lifelong cultural activism. In his later years, he established the Centre for Learning of Ubuntu, chaired the Phoenix Settlement Trust, and continued his sporadic writing career.

== Early life and education ==
Ramgobin was born on 10 November 1932 in Inanda in the former Natal Province. His father was a successful farmer and the son of Indian immigrants who had arrived in Natal as indentured labourers. He attended school in Inanda and later in Greyville, Durban.

Though not born into a political family, Ramgobin was affected by his upbringing in Inanda, then one of the only regions of Natal in which black and Indian people owned property as neighbours, as well as by early campaigns of the anti-apartheid movement, such as the Freedom Charter campaign and the 1959 potato boycott. As a student in the non-white section of the University of Natal, Ramgobin was president of the student representative council and a member of the executive of the National Union of South African Students.

== Anti-apartheid activism ==
After his marriage to Ela Gandhi in 1960, Ramgobin joined the Phoenix Settlement, a settlement on the outskirts of Inanda that had been established by Gandhi's grandfather, Mahatma Gandhi. Later the same year, Ramgobin joined Nokukhanya Luthuli and others in participating in a five-day fast, in the Gandhian tradition, in protest of the Sharpeville massacre and subsequent banning of anti-apartheid organisations by the state. Over the next decade, Ramgobin and his wife were central figures in the Phoenix Settlement, which they attempted to establish as a "liberated space" for political and cultural collaboration across ideological and racial lines. The Phoenix Settlement Trust, of which Ramgobin was secretary, established a host of community projects, including a child-welfare clinic.

In 1965, while Ramgobin was the secretary of a committee planning celebrations of Gandhi's centenary, he was served with his first banning order, which confined him to house arrest. Shortly after the ban expired, in 1970, he founded the Committee for Clemency with Rick Turner, Alan Paton, and Lewis Skweyiya. The clemency campaign advocated for the unbanning of the African National Congress (ANC) and for the release of Nelson Mandela and other political prisoners, and it resulted in another banning order, which confined Ramgobin to house arrest between September 1971 and February 1973.

=== Revival of the Natal Indian Congress: 1971 ===
The 1971 banning order came amid Ramgobin's preparations for the relaunch of the Natal Indian Congress, an initiative which he had spearheaded. The congress was originally founded by Mahatma Gandhi in the Natal Colony and was later active in the Congress Alliance of the 1950s, but it had fallen into dormancy in the 1960s. According to Ramgobin, he and several friends in Phoenix viewed its revival as a means of re-establishing a progressive Indian voice against apartheid, amid concerns that the establishment of the South African Indian Council would succeed in co-opting Indian dissent.

At a community meeting at Durban's Bolton Hall on 25 June 1971, attendees had agreed to revive the congress and had established an ad hoc committee, chaired by Ramgobin, to carry out the task. The official relaunch took place on 2 October, Gandhi's birthday, but Ramgobin had been banned a fortnight earlier and did not assume his presumptive leadership role. George Sewpersadh served as president instead. Ramgobin was nonetheless a central figure in the leadership of the congress, though he remained restricted by police even after his house arrest was lifted in February 1973. His office in Durban was the target of a parcel bomb in March 1973, and subsequent police restrictions barred him from going to the office anyway; he and his family re-settled in Verulam instead. He was banned for another five years from 1975.

=== Pietermaritzburg Treason Trial: 1984–1985 ===
In 1983, Ramgobin attended the launch of the United Democratic Front (UDF), a popular front against apartheid; he was elected as the front's inaugural co-treasurer, serving alongside Cas Saloojee. The Natal Indian Congress affiliated to the UDF and became a major force in its largely successful campaign to boycott the 1984 general election and the new Tricameral Parliament. Ramgobin was arrested ahead of the 1984 election but was released on 7 September by order of the Supreme Court, which ruled that his and other activists' detention was not justified by Law and Order Minister Louis le Grange's contention that they had been trying to "create a revolutionary climate".

Upon their release, Ramgobin and five others – among them UDF co-president Archie Gumede – went into hiding to evade arrest under the new detention orders freshly signed by le Grange. From 13 September to 6 October, the so-called Durban Six took refuge in the British consulate in Durban, creating a major diplomatic incident. Ramgobin and two others voluntarily left the consulate and 6 October and were immediately re-arrested on the pavement in front of the consulate. In December, they were charged with treason.

The ensuing Pietermaritzburg Treason Trial was heard in the Natal Supreme Court in 1985. Ramgobin, four other members of the Durban Six, and 11 other UDF activists were together accused of having formed a "revolutionary alliance" with illegal political organisations – chiefly the ANC – for the purpose of inciting revolt to overthrow the government. On 9 December 1985, 12 of the 16 defendants, including Ramgobin, were released after the state announced that it would withdraw the charges against them.

While there is no doubt that we were on trial, apartheid was also on trial and the method of our struggle under the banner of the Natal Indian Congress and the United Democratic Front was held in question. Now there is a vindication, and we do hope that the rulers of South Africa will come to their senses.

— Statement by Ramgobin, December 1985

After his release, Ramgobin resumed his political activity with the UDF and Natal Indian Congress and continued to receive attention from the police. In total, in the 25 years between 1965 and 1990, he spent a cumulative 12 years under house arrest and 17 years under banning orders.

== Legislative career: 1994–2009 ==
In South Africa's first post-apartheid elections in 1994, Ramgobin was elected to an ANC seat in the National Assembly, the lower house of the new South African Parliament. He served three terms in his seat, gaining re-election in 1999 and 2004, and served on the Portfolio Committee on Foreign Affairs. He retired from Parliament after the 2009 general election.

== Personal life and retirement ==
=== Philosophy and culture ===
After his retirement from politics, Ramgobin chaired the Phoenix Settlement Trust and established the Centre for Learning of Ubuntu. A lifelong adherent of Gandhian philosophy, he was a prominent activist for the propagation of satyagraha and for its union with the traditional African philosophy of ubuntu. He did not accept Indian citizenship when it was proffered to South African Indians in the early 2000s, saying that he considered dual citizenship "not only as an anachronism, but a betrayal". He urged other South African Indians to reject the offer, which he said was contrary to the Nehruivian-Gandhian spirit of the Indian constitution and would undermine nation-building in South Africa.

A former vice-president of the Congress of South African Writers, Ramgobin was also a published author: his political novel, Waiting to Live, was published by Vintage in 1986, and Prisms of Light, a memoir in vignettes, was published in 2009. Later in his life, he travelled to India to pursue his childhood dream of becoming a Bollywood star; he was hired as an extra in two films.

=== Family ===
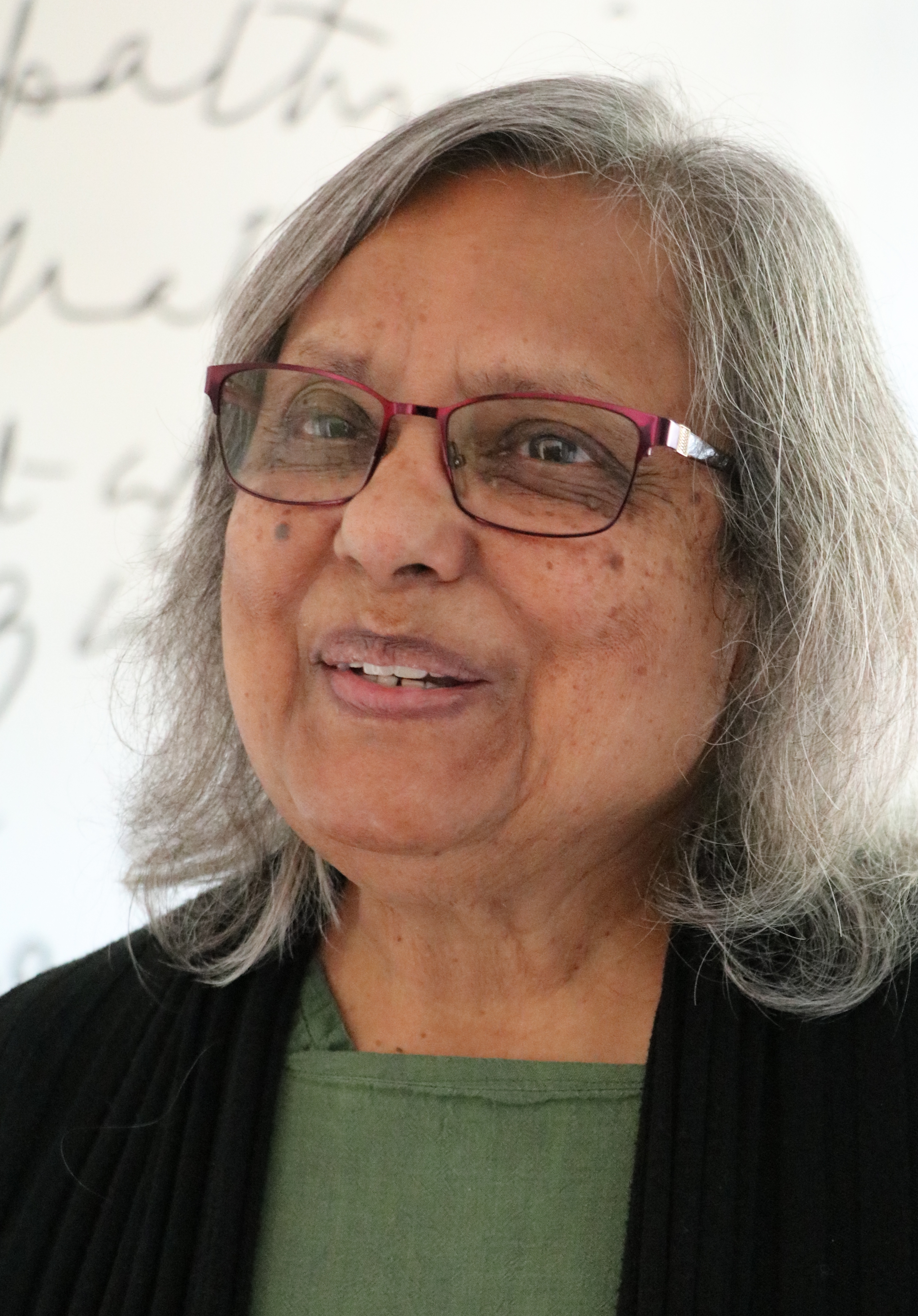
Ramgobin was married to activist Ela Gandhi for three decades

Ramgobin met his first wife, Ela Gandhi, at the University of Natal, and they married in India in 1960. Gandhi later described the marriage as an "act of defiance" against her mother, who thought that, at 21, she was too young to be married. They had five children together: Kidar, Kush, Asha, Arti, and Asish. Kush was shot dead at his home in Verulam in January 1993 in an apparent robbery, although his murder was also linked to ongoing political violence in the area. Asish, a businesswoman, was convicted of fraud and forgery in 2021 after a highly publicised trial.

After Ramgobin and Gandhi divorced in 1990, he remarried Mariam Moosagee Amajee, with whom he had one son, named Imthian. They lived in Cape Town, where Ramgobin died in hospital on 17 October 2016. He had been unwell for some time and had been admitted to hospital on 8 October.
