= George Sewpersadh =

South African activist (1936–2007)

George Sewpersadh OLS
- Born: Chanderdeo Sewpersadh; 7 October 1936; Cato Manor, Natal Province; Union of South Africa
- Died: 18 May 2007 (aged 70); Durban, South Africa
- Education: University of Natal
- Known for: President of the Natal Indian Congress

Chanderdeo "George" Sewpersadh OLS (7 October 1936 – 18 May 2007), also spelled Sewpershad, was a South African lawyer and anti-apartheid activist. He was a former president of the Natal Indian Congress and a defendant in the 1985 Pietermaritzburg Treason Trial.

== Early life and education ==
Sewpersadh was born on 7 October 1936 in Cato Manor, an Indian area on the outskirts of Durban in the former Natal Province. His father was a newspaper vendor and his mother was a housewife. Their family moved to Reservoir Hills during his childhood, and he matriculated at Sastri College in Durban. Thereafter he attended the University of Natal from 1955 to 1960, completing a BA in 1957 and an LLB in 1960.

While a BA student, in December 1956, Sewpersadh joined the Natal Indian Congress (NIC), inspired by opposition to apartheid but also by the Indian independence movement and its heroes, Jawaharlal Nehru and Mahatma Gandhi. He became the founding chairperson of a new NIC branch in Cato Manor. However, the NIC fell into dormancy in the mid-1960s. Sewpersadh instead focused on establishing his practice as a lawyer in the Durban suburb of Verulam.

== Career and activism ==
When the NIC was relaunched in June 1971, Sewpersadh was elected as its president; the presumptive president, Mewa Ramgobin, was banned at the time and therefore was unable to stand. Jerry Coovadia said that Sewpersadh was an appealing candidate because he was "an old school type liberal: big on due process, civil rights and liberties, human rights." As leader of the NIC he faced arrest and banning orders on several occasions; during a prolonged banning from 1973 to 1978, M. J. Naidoo replaced him as NIC president.

In spring 1984, Sewpersadh was one of the so-called Durban Six who evaded arrest by taking refuge in the British Consulate in Durban. On 6 October 1984, after three weeks in the consulate, Sewpersadh and two of his NIC colleagues – Naidoo and Ramgobin – voluntarily left the consulate and were immediately re-arrested on the pavement outside. They were subsequently charged with treason in the Pietermaritzburg Treason Trial, though the charges against them were dropped in December 1985.

He died in Durban on 18 May 2007 after a short illness; he had cancer. He was unmarried. His memorial service was held at Kendra Hall in Durban, and speakers included Constitutional Court Justice Pius Langa.

== Honours ==
In October 2008, President Thabo Mbeki admitted Sewpersadh posthumously to the Order of Luthuli, awarding him the order in silver for "Opposing the apartheid regime and striving for the ideals of a non-racial, non-sexist, just and democratic South Africa." Also in 2008, the City of eThekwini renamed Verulam's Moss Street as George Sewpersadh Street.
