= Paul David (activist) =

South African activist (1940–2020)

- Born: Devdas Paul Davis; 26 August 1940; Pietermaritzburg, Natal Province; Union of South Africa
- Died: 13 August 2020 (aged 79); Stanger, KwaZulu-Natal
- Known for: Anti-apartheid activism

Devdas Paul Davis (26 August 1940 – 13 August 2020) was a South African anti-apartheid activist. A member of the United Democratic Front and Natal Indian Congress, he was one of the Durban Six in 1984 and a defendant in the Pietermaritzburg Treason Trial in 1985.

== Biography ==
David was born on 26 August 1940 in Pietermaritzburg. He attended Verulam High School and studied law at the University of Natal. He joined the Natal Indian Congress (NIC) as a teenager. He was one of nine siblings; his eldest sister, Phyllis Naidoo, and her husband, M. D. Naidoo, were also prominent activists.

He was elected as secretary of the NIC in 1979 and as secretary of the Release Mandela Committee in 1983. In 1984, he was one of the so-called Durban Six who took refuge in the British Consulate in Durban. Upon leaving the consulate in December 1984, he was charged with treason as one of 16 defendants in the Pietermaritzburg Treason Trial. However, the charges against him were dropped in December 1985.

After the end of apartheid, David practiced law and served a stint as a local councillor in Stanger. After a prolonged illness, he died on 13 August 2020 at his daughter's home in Stanger. Speakers at his memorial service included Frank Chikane, Ela Gandhi, Jerry Coovadia, Lechesa Tsenoli, and Pravin Gordhan.
