= Transvaal Indian Congress =

Civil rights organisation for South African Indians (1903–1994)

- Ideology: Indian interests Socialism; Nonviolent resistance (initially); Revolutionary socialism (from 1930s); Anti-racism; Anti-Apartheid
- Political position: Left-wing (initially); Far-left (later)
- Religion: Hinduism, Islam
- National affiliation: South African Indian Congress

The Transvaal Indian Congress (TIC) was a political organisation established in 1903 to fight discrimination against Indians in the Transvaal Colony, and later the Transvaal Province, of South Africa. Founded in 1903 as the Transvaal British Indian Association, it was a member of the South African Indian Congress alongside its elder and larger sibling, the Natal Indian Congress. It fell dormant after the end of apartheid in 1994.

== Origins ==
The TIC was generally a moderate organisation in its formative years. It was active in passive resistance campaigns organised by Mahatma Gandhi in 1908 and 1913, but at other times relied largely, like the NIC, on the moderate methods of petitions and deputations to authorities. It adopted a more militant stance only from the 1930s, when Yusuf Dadoo and his peers – among them Molvi Cachalia – emerged as key progressive figures in the congress. Dadoo was elected as TIC president in 1946, the year after his progressive counterpart in Natal, Monty Naicker, took office.

Dadoo led the group through a campaign of passive resistance against the Asiatic Land Tenure and Indian Representation Act from 1946 to 1948. It subsequently became active in opposing apartheid, including during the Defiance Campaign of 1952. In the late 1950s, the TIC, then based in Fordsburg, was generally more radical than the larger and older NIC, particularly in its support for Nelson Mandela's proposal to prepare for armed struggle against the apartheid regime. However, during the 1960s and 1970s, the TIC fell into dormancy due to the extent of state repression against the Congress Alliance, with some leaders (such as Dadoo) living in exile and others (like Ahmed Kathrada) imprisoned.

== Revival ==
The first signs of the TIC's revival were in 1981, when a community meeting in Lenasia agreed to form the Transvaal Anti-South African Indian Council Committee to advocate boycotts of elections to the South African Indian Council, a government advisory body. After a successful boycott, the committee held a conference in January 1983, at which attendees decided to revive the TIC. At the same conference, Reverend Allan Boesak made his famous call for the establishment of a "united front" against apartheid, which led later that year to the founding of the United Democratic Front (UDF).

Meanwhile, the TIC was formally relaunched in May 1983. Essop Jassat was appointed president, with Ram Saloojee as his deputy. Jassat was replaced by Cassim Saloojee at the next elective conference in August 1988. The TIC was a founding affiliate of the UDF and was a prominent player in the campaign to boycott the 1984 elections and the new Tricameral Parliament, which purported to represent Indians through the House of Delegates.

Although the TIC was represented at the Convention for a Democratic South Africa in 1991, it did not restructure itself as a political party during South Africa's democratic transition. Instead, many leaders and members joined the African National Congress (ANC), and the TIC again fell into dormancy from around the time of the first post-apartheid elections in 1994. Jassat, Kathrada, Ram Saloojee, and Cassim Saloojee were among the TIC stalwarts who went on to represent the ANC in Parliament.
