= Yusuf Dadoo =

South African activist (1909–1983)

President of the South African Indian Congress
- In office 1950–1952
- Preceded by: Monty Naicker

Chairman of the South African Communist Party
- In office 1972–1983
- Preceded by: J. B. Marks
- Succeeded by: Dan Tloome

Personal details
- Born: Yusuf Mohamed Dadoo; 5 September 1909 Krugersdorp, West Rand, South Africa
- Died: 19 September 1983 (aged 74) London, England
- Resting place: Highgate Cemetery, London, England
- Citizenship: South African
- Party: South African Communist Party; South African Indian Congress
- Education: Aligarh Muslim University; Edinburgh University
- Occupation: Politician
- Awards: Isitwalandwe/Seaparankoe (1955); Order of Friendship of Peoples (1979); Order of Georgi Dimitrov (1980); Order for Meritorious Service in gold (2003)

Yusuf Mohamed Dadoo OMSG (5 September 1909 – 19 September 1983) was a South African Communist and an anti-apartheid activist. During his life, he was chair of both the South African Indian Congress and the South African Communist Party, as well as being a major proponent of co-operation between those organisations and the African National Congress. He was a leader of the Defiance Campaign and a defendant at the Treason Trial in 1956. His last days were spent in exile in London, where he is buried at Highgate Cemetery; a few metres away from the Tomb of Karl Marx.

== Early life ==
Yusuf was born on 5 September 1909 in Krugersdorp, in the West Rand, near Johannesburg. His parents, Mohammed and Fatima Dadoo, were Gujarati Muslim immigrants from Surat in Western India. As a young child, he had the formative experience of being scolded by his mother for climbing a tree in his neighbourhood park, which was reserved for White people only. Aged ten, the Krugersdorp Municipality attempted to evict his father from his shop on racial grounds, but he was successfully defended in court by Mohandas Gandhi. At high school, Yusuf attended meetings by former stalwarts of Gandhi, and along with Ismail Cachalia and other schoolmates, raised funds and awareness for the All India National Congress. When he was fifteen, he presided over a protest organised and led by visiting Indian poet Sarojini Naidu against the proposed Class Areas Bill. Later that year, he was sent to Aligarh College in India to complete his schooling, as the Johannesburg Indian Government School did not offer secondary education up to matriculation level.

== University in London and Edinburgh ==
At the age of eighteen, having completed secondary education, Yusuf returned to Krugersdorp; where his father insisted that he help with running his business, despite Yusuf's desire to study law. After two years of clashes, including Yusuf organising a strike by his father's African employees, and running away from home, Mohammed agreed to send Yusuf to London to study medicine. In London, Yusuf continued to be politically active, and was arrested for participating in a protest against the Simon Commission. Hearing of his arrest, his parents had him transfer to Edinburgh University, where he completed his higher education. In Edinburgh, Yusuf met many fellow students from across the British Empire, giving him a broader view of colonialism. Inspired by the rise of the Labour Party at the 1929 UK general election, he began to read Marxist literature, joined the Independent Labour Party, and delivered Communist speeches at the Edinburgh speakers' corner. He also befriended fellow student and Indian South African Monty Naicker. In 1936, Dadoo was awarded his medical degree, LRCPS, and returned to South Africa resolved to revitalise the struggle against racial discrimination there.

== Return to South Africa and revitalisation of the struggle ==
Shortly after his return home, Yusuf bought a house and set up a medical practice in Doornfontein, Johannesburg. He soon became involved with the Transvaal Indian Congress (TIC), an organisation that had been involved with the earlier Gandhian protests, but found it to be dominated by the interests of wealthier Indians over the working-class, and by moderates reluctant to engage in passive resistance against the government. In 1938, Yusuf became a founding member and the secretary of the Non-European United Front (NEUF). In 1939, along with both younger members and veterans of Gandhi's campaigns, he founded a nationalist bloc within the TIC, with the goal of commencing a passive resistance campaign against the recently passed Asiatic Land Tenure Act. This view rapidly gained in popularity, and despite the misgivings of its leadership, the TIC set the date of 1 August 1939 for the commencement of passive resistance. At the time, neither the Natal Indian Congress (NIC) nor the South African Indian Congress (SAIC) officially endorsed the campaign, despite popular support among Indians. The campaign was postponed, however, at the personal request of Gandhi, leaving Yusuf to join the Communist Party of South Africa (CPSA), and focus on anti-war activism with the outbreak of World War II.

In 1941, the German invasion of the Soviet Union prompted the CPSA to drop its opposition to participation in the war, and change to a position of support for what it saw as a "people's war". Inspired by the exploits of the Red Army in the defence of the Soviet Union, non-European protest movements in South Africa became more militant. By the end of the war, the African National Congress was dominated by leaders such as Walter Sisulu, Oliver Tambo and Nelson Mandela, while the TIC and NIC were dominated by Yusuf Dadoo and Monty Naicker, respectively. In 1946, Yusuf and Monty led the NIC Passive Resistance Campaign against the Asiatic Land Tenure and Indian Representation Bill, which continued until 1948 but did not succeed in having any of the legislation it opposed repealed. In 1947, the two, along with Alfred Bitini Xuma signed the "three doctors pact" of cooperation between the ANC, TIC and NIC, calling for the right to vote, freedom of movement, education and equal opportunity for all non-European South Africans.

== Apartheid and resistance ==
In 1948, the National Party (NP) was elected as the ruling party of the country in the racially restricted general election. The NP immediately began implementing a formal policy of racial segregation and restriction of the rights of non-white South Africans, known as Apartheid. In 1949, they also introduced the Suppression of Communism Bill to ban the South African Communist Party, causing the CPSA to pre-emptively disband and go underground. In 1950, Yusuf was elected president of the SAIC, which promptly joined with the ANC in organising the Defiance Campaign against Apartheid. Yusuf was the deputy chair of the planning council, headed by Walter Sisulu, and the two were mainly responsible for the report around which the campaign was organised.

By 1952, the government responded to the Defiance Campaign by introducing more oppressive legislation. Dadoo was banned from attending all gatherings and ordered to resign from the SAIC and the Defiance Campaign planning committee. In 1953, Dadoo and others secretly reconstituted the CPSA as the South African Communist Party (SACP), with Yusuf serving as chairman of the central committee. That same year, Yusuf was further banned from participating in fifteen protest organisations. Under these bans, he was unable to openly participate on the Congress Alliance and the writing of the Freedom Charter, although he continued to be consulted in secret, his advice being greatly respected. In 1957, he was explicitly banned from speaking to more than one person at a time.

== Exile and party chairmanship ==
In 1960, the Sharpeville Massacre prompted the government to declare a state of national emergency and issue warrants for the arrest of most known leaders of protest organisations. Dadoo evaded arrest and operated underground for several months, until the SACP, in consultation with the SAIC, decided to smuggle him out of the country to act as an international spokesperson for the struggle. Dadoo strongly disagreed with the idea, but was overruled, and finally agreed to go into exile in London.

In 1972, the then-chairman of the SACP, J. B. Marks, died, and Dadoo was unanimously elected in his place. He continued in this role, as chairman in exile, until his death.

== Death ==
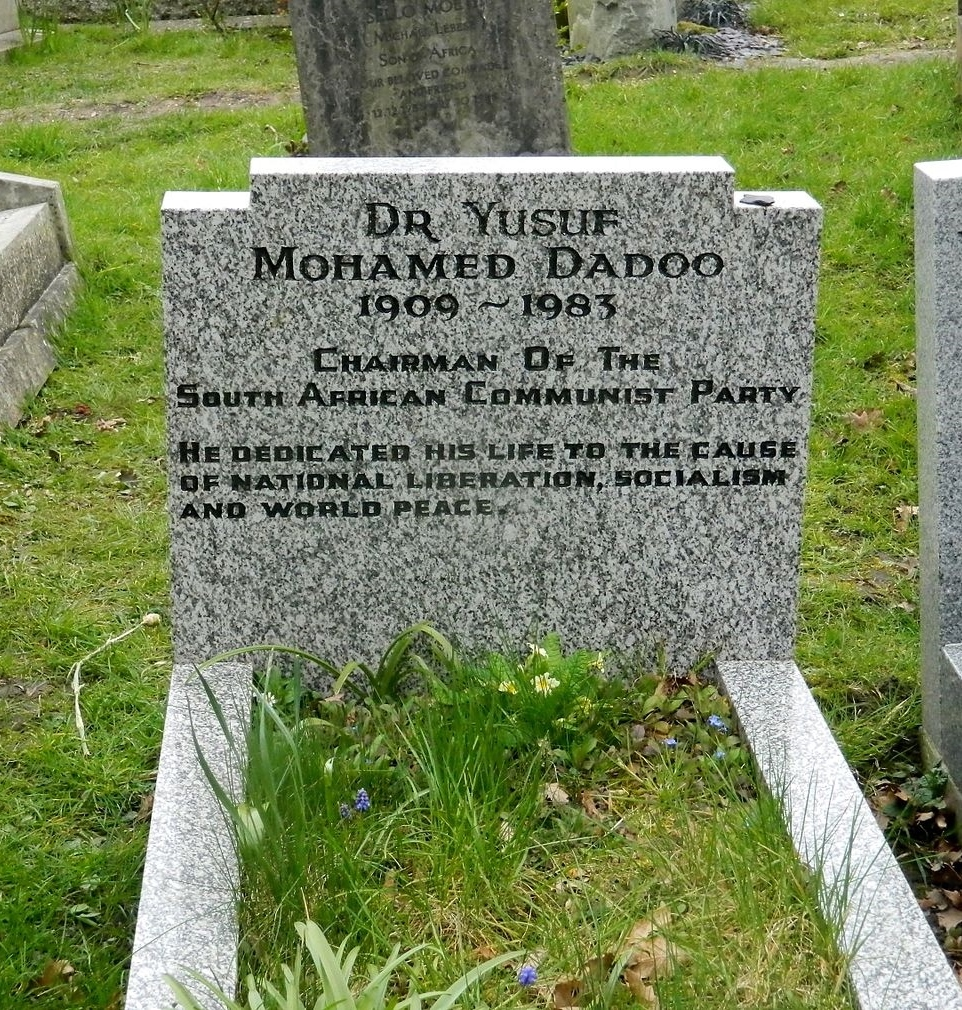
Grave of Yusuf Dadoo

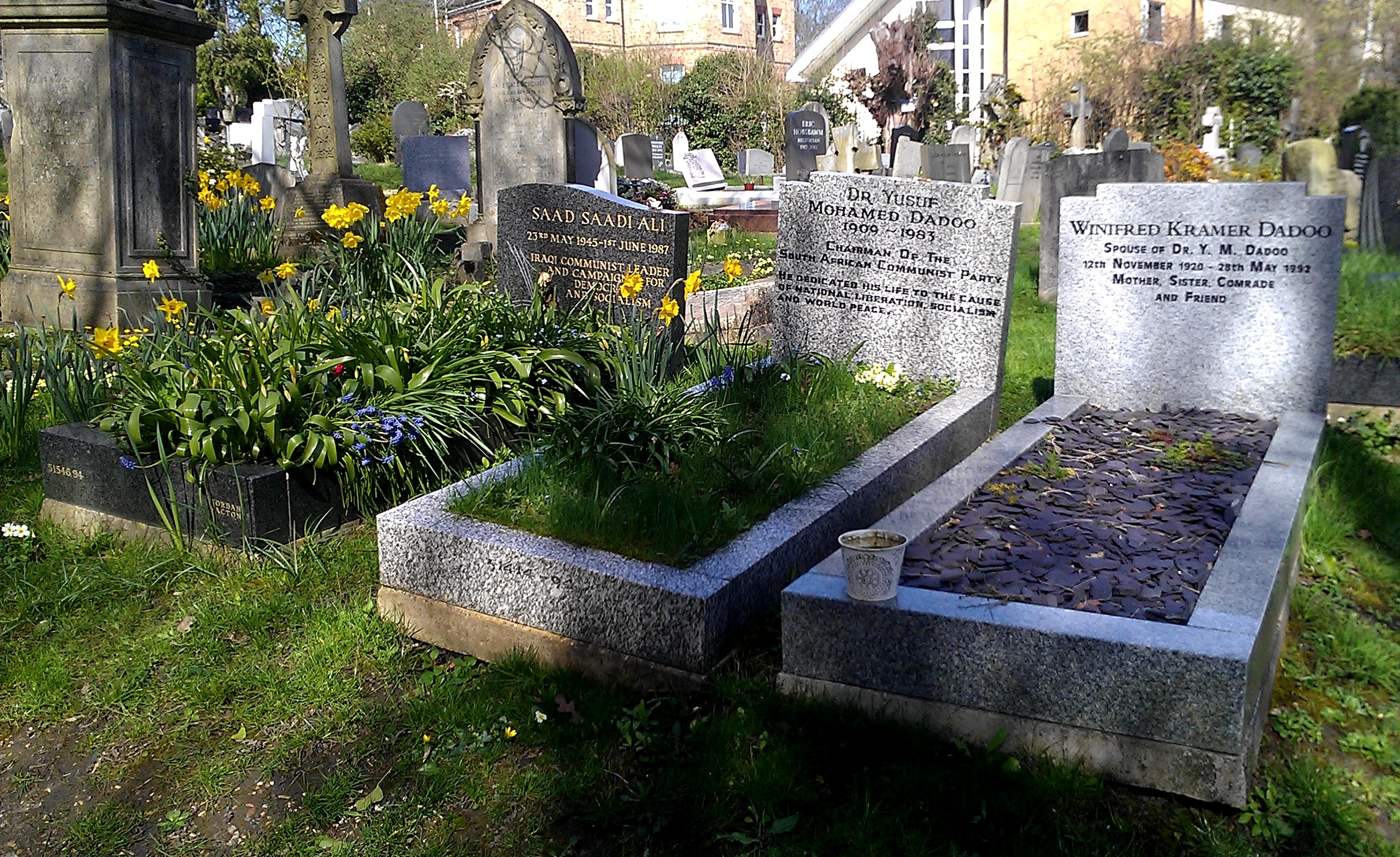
Dadoo's grave is situated between that of Saad Saadi Ali (left) and his wife (right)

Dadoo died of prostate cancer on 19 September 1983. Prior to his death, he attempted to arrange with Joe Slovo to have his body smuggled to South Africa for burial as an act of defiance, but this plan failed. Instead, he was given a Muslim burial (at his behest) and interred at Highgate Cemetery alongside fellow Iraqi Communist Muslim activist Saad Saadi Ali, and a few metres away from the grave of Karl Marx. His dying words were "You must never give up, You must fight to the end."

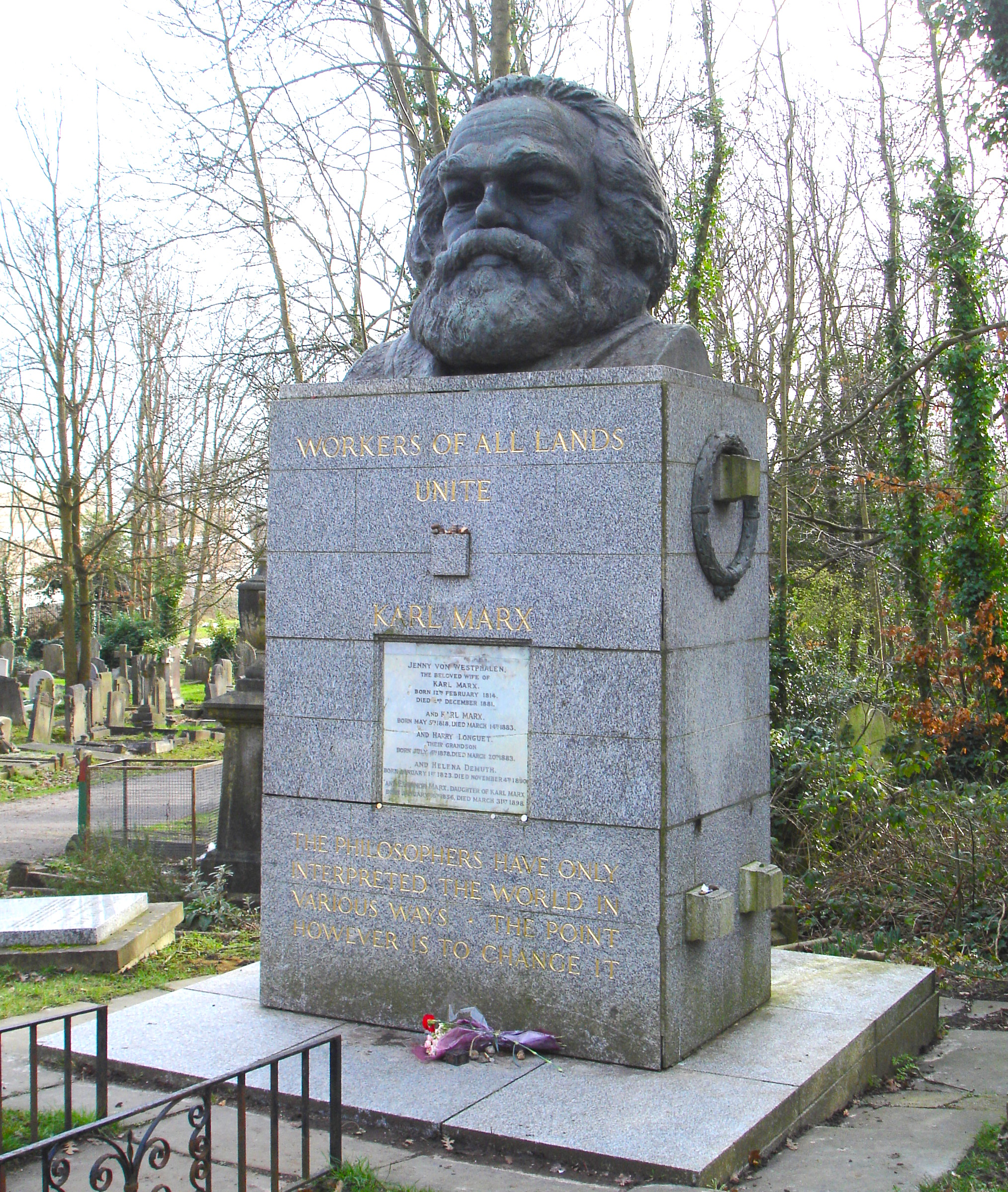
Grave of Karl Marx. Yusuf Dadoo's grave is about five metres away to the left.

== Legacy ==
Condolences were sent by communist and socialist leaders worldwide, as well as from other anti-apartheid activist leaders. In South Africa, however, a meeting and two pamphlets paying him tribute were immediately banned.

After the 1994 general election and the downfall of Apartheid, Dr Dadoo came to be considered a national hero. In Krugersdorp, a primary school and a hospital were named after him.

Centenary celebrations for Dr Dadoo were held in 2009 at the University of Johannesburg. In Nelson Mandela's message to the celebrations, he called Dadoo "one of the giants of our country's struggle for freedom", and "[one of] the founders of a democratic South Africa".
