= Archie Gumede =

South African politician and lawyer (1914–1998)

Archibald Jacob Gumede OLS (1914–1998) was a South African anti-apartheid activist, lawyer and politician. Gumede was born in Pietermaritzburg to Josiah Tshangana Gumede, an early African National Congress leader. Archie Gumede led the Natal delegates at the 1955 Congress of the People in Kliptown during which the Freedom Charter was written. He was later an attorney and practiced in Pietermaritzburg. He was a leader in the United Democratic Front, a broad based coalition of groups seeking to end apartheid. Following the end of apartheid in 1994, Gumede became a member of the National Assembly of South Africa before dying in office in 1998.

== See also ==
- List of members of the National Assembly of South Africa who died in office
