= Asiatic Land Tenure and Indian Representation Act, 1946 =

South African legislation limiting rights of the Indian minority

Parliament of South Africa
- Long title: Act to impose restrictions with regard to the acquisition and occupation of fixed property in the Province of Natal; to amend the law relating to the ownership and occupation of fixed property in the Province of Transvaal; to make special provision for the representation in Parliament of Indians in the Provinces of Natal and Transvaal, and for the representation in the Provincial Council of Natal, of Indians in that province; and to provide for other incidental matters.
- Citation: Act No. 28 of 1946
- Enacted by: Parliament of South Africa
- Royal assent: 3 June 1946
- Commenced: 6 June 1946
- Repealed: 12 October 1948 (representation); 30 June 1991 (land tenure)
- Administered by: Minister of the Interior

Repealed by
- Asiatic Laws Amendment Act, 1948 (representation); Abolition of Racially Based Land Measures Act, 1991 (land tenure)
- Status: Repealed

The Asiatic Land Tenure and Indian Representation Act, 1946 (Act No. 28 of 1946; subsequently renamed the Asiatic Land Tenure Act, 1946, and also known as the "Ghetto Act") of South Africa sought to confine South Asian ownership and occupation of land to certain clearly defined areas of towns. The Act also prohibited South Asians from owning or occupying property without a permit when such property had not been owned or occupied by South Asians before 1946.

Furthermore, it granted Indians in the Transvaal and Natal the right to elect White South Africans to represent them in Parliament and for Natal Indians to represent themselves in the Natal Provincial Council.

The Act deprived the Indian South Africans of communal representation and took away their fundamental and elementary right of land ownership and occupation. It is called and regarded universally by Indian South Africans as the "Ghetto Act".

The act struck at the heart of Indian South African commercial and economic life. Not only did it intend to reduce the levels of Indian trade and reduce progress in the acquisition of fixed property, it also is thought to have reduced the opportunities of the masses of the Indian South Africans to earn a decent living and ultimately condemn them to existence in increasingly over-crowded slums and locations. Thus on 31 March 1948, it is thought that about 6,000 Indian South Africans marched in protest to the Act in Durban.

The sections of the act granting representation in Parliament and the provincial council were repealed by the Asiatic Laws Amendment Act, 1948. The rest of the act was repealed by the Abolition of Racially Based Land Measures Act, 1991.

== See also ==
- Apartheid legislation
- Apartheid in South Africa
