= Kay Moonsamy =

South African politician (1926–2017)

Member of the National Assembly of South Africa
- In office 1999–2009
- Preceded by: Limpho Hani

Personal details
- Born: Kesval Moonsamy; 5 July 1926 Durban, Natal Province, Union of South Africa
- Died: 21 June 2017 (aged 90) Durban, KwaZulu-Natal, South Africa
- Party: African National Congress
- Other political affiliations: South African Communist Party
- Spouse: Kendhri
- Children: 6

Kesval Moonsamy (5 July 1926 – 21 June 2017) was a South African trade unionist, politician and anti-apartheid activist. He was one of the 156 accused in the 1956 Treason Trial. He went into exile in 1965 and returned to South Africa in 1991. Moonsamy was elected treasurer of the South African Communist Party in 1997 and served as an African National Congress Member of Parliament from 1999 until 2009.

== Early life ==
The son of an indentured labourer, Kesval Moonsamy was born on 5 July 1926 in Durban, then part of the Union of South Africa's Natal Province. When he was 14, he became a factory worker to assist his family. He soon became involved in the trade union movement and by the age of 19, he was president of the Natal Box, Broom and Brush Workers' Union. Moonsamy had also become a member of the Communist Party of South Africa when he was 18 and 5 years later he gained election to the Durban committee of the party.

During the same period, Moonsamy was also involved in the Natal Indian Congress (NIC). He supported Monty Naicker's leadership of the progressive faction of the organisation and was part of the formation of the "anti-segregation council" in opposition to the conservative Kajee-Pather bloc of the organisation which sought to exclusively focus on the issues of Indian South Africans and not be affiliated with the African National Congress (ANC). Moonsamy was part of the recruitment drive which recruited 30,000 progressives to the organisation which resulted in the progressive faction's triumph over the Kajee-Pather bloc. The NIC then united the Transvaal Indian Congress in coordinating the 1946 Passive Resistance campaign against residential segregation. Moonsamy and 25,000 other protesters marched from Red Square to a piece of vacant land at the intersection of Gale Street and Umbilo Road in Durban on 13 June 1946, in defiance of the Asiatic Land Tenure and Indian Representation Act of 1946 which prohibited Indians from buying land from non-Indians except in certain areas. Moonsamy was arrested on his 20th birthday and sentenced to four months at the Durban Central Prison.

== Anti-apartheid activism ==
The National Party of South Africa came to power after their victory in the 1948 general election and began instituting the policy of apartheid. After the passing of the Suppression of Communism Act of 1950 which banned the Communist Party of South Africa, Moonsamy began working for the party's underground structures.

In 1956, Moonsamy and 155 other leaders of the Congress Movement were arrested and charged with treason. The trial which became known as the Treason Trial ended in 1961 with all of the accused being acquitted. Moonsamy spent his time underground following the State of Emergency in 1960. In May 1961, he was an organiser of the three-day national protest. Moonsamy was given a banning order in 1963 and was arrested a month later after breaking it.

Despite Indian South Africans not being allowed to become members of the ANC, Moonsamy went into exile in 1965 at the request of the party. He left his wife Kendhri and children behind. He only saw them again in Swaziland in 1980, fifteen years after he went into exile. Having left South Africa on 29 June 1965, he lived in Botswana for three years before going to the ANC's headquarters in Lusaka in Zambia where he helped organise the party's 1969 Morogoro Conference in Morogoro, Tanzania, at which the party's membership was opened to South Africans of all races.

Moonsamy became the ANC's chief representative in 1978 and subsequently went to New Delhi. In 1983, he was elected treasurer-general of the South African Congress of Trade Unions (SACTU), a position he held until 1987. He became the final president of SACTU in 1989. While in Tanzania, Moonsamy helped to organise the Solomon Mahlangu Freedom College. He returned to South Africa in 1991.

== After apartheid ==
Moonsamy was elected as treasurer of the South African Communist Party in 1997. Following Limpho Hani's resignation as a Member of the National Assembly of South Africa in August 1999, Moonsamy was elected to take up her seat in parliament. He went on to serve as a Member of Parliament until 2009.

Moonsamy was awarded the Order of Luthuli in bronze in 2015.

In June 2016, Moonsamy and fellow activist of the 1946 Passive Resistance, Swaminathan Gounden, gathered at the Red Square in Durban which is now the Nichol Square Parkade. The square was the main place for political meetings during the 1940s and 1950s.

== Death ==
Moonsamy died on 21 June 2017. He was 90 at the time of his death. His wife had died in 2011. President Jacob Zuma declared a Special Provincial Official Funeral for Moonsamy and instructed that the national flag be flown at half-mast at all of the flag stations in KwaZulu-Natal on the day of his funeral. His funeral was held on 24 June 2017 at the Clare Estate Crematorium.
