= Marimuthu Pragalathan Naicker =

South African journalist and activist (1920–1977)

- Born: 28 July 1920; Durban, Natal, South Africa
- Died: 29 April 1977 (aged 56)
- Burial place: Golders Green Crematorium, London, England
- Occupations: journalist, anti-apartheid activist and trade unionist
- Years active: 1944-1977
- Employer(s): New Age, The Guardian, Flash, Sechaba
- Organization(s): Natal Sugar Workers' Union, Anti-Segregation Council, South African Communist Party, South African Indian Congress, African National Congress, International Organization of Journalists
- Children: 2
- Relatives: Monty Naicker (cousin)

Marimuthu Pragalathan "M. P." Naicker (c. 28 July 1920 – 29 April 1977) was a South African journalist, anti-apartheid activist and trade unionist.

Naicker was a member of the South African Communist Party, Natal Sugar Workers' Union, Natal Indian Congress (NIC), South African Indian Congress (SAIC) and African National Congress (ANC).

Naicker went into exile in 1965 and became the Director of Publicity for the ANC's External Mission in London, England, and a member of the International Organisation of Journalists (IOJ) committee.

== Early life and education ==
Marimuthu Pragalathan Naicker, later known as "M. P.", was born in 1920 in Durban, South Africa. He was born into a working-class family of Indian descent, and had to leave primary school to work in a factory.

In 1943, Naicker married a woman named Sarogoonam, also known as Saro. They had a son, Pren Naicker, who trained in Moscow to become a doctor, and a daughter Suganya Naicker.

== Career and activism ==
Naicker began working as a lorry driver then was employed as a full time union organiser in Natal, organising among sugar plantation workers. He rose to become secretary of the Natal Sugar Workers' Union and was a member of the Natal Indian Congress (NIC). He joined the South African Communist Party (SACP) at age 18, after reading the writings of Karl Marx.

In 1944, Naicker joined the Anti-Segregation Council, which was founded to pursue mass mobilisation against Indian segregation. His cousin Monty Naicker was the founding chairperson. In 1945, Naicker was among those in the Anti-Segregation Council who succeeded in ousting the NIC's moderate leadership under (which had been under A. I. Kajee and P. R. Pather).

Naicker was involved in the organisation of the 1946 passive resistance campaign with Debi Singh, and edited the Passive Resistance Bulletin (Flash). He was imprisoned twice during the campaign for month long terms. His wife Saro also participated in the campaign and was imprisoned for a month with hard labour.

In 1952, Naicker was appointed as volunteer-in-chief and as joint secretary, alongside Massabalala Yengwa, of the Joint Action Council in Natal for the Defiance Campaign of the South African Indian Congress (SAIC). He served a month imprisonment with hard labour for having participated in the Campaign. Whilst in prison, he met and befriended Albert Luthuli. Around this time, he worked for the leftist newspaper New Age, based in Johannesburg, alongside other employees such as Joe Nzingo Gqabi. It ceased publication in 1963.

In 1956, he was appointed editor of the anti-apartheid newspaper The Guardian. He is credited with reorganising the papers Durban based bureau and establishing the paper as a key publication in resistance politics in Natal. Naicker was also involved with the publication Spark, and was featured on the front page of the final issue before the paper was banned in South Africa, alongside Brain Bunting, Fred Carneson, Ruth First, and Govan Mbeki.

Naicker was charged alongside 155 other activists at the 1956 Treason Trials. His charge was withdrawn in 1958, but he was imprisoned again for four months in 1960, for 90 days in 1963 and 180 days in 1964. In 1962, his brother Coetsie Naicker was among a group of activist who dynamited three electrical pylons in Clairwood, Durban.

== Exile ==
In 1965, Naicker left South Africa and was active in political work and the anti-apartheid movement in exile. During his exile, he became the Director of Publicity of the African National Congress (ANC) External Mission in London, using the pseudonym Mandla Nkosi. Naicker travelled abroad to several African nations, the Soviet Union and Chechoslovakia to represent the ANC.

Naicker was also a journalist for the ANC journal Sechaba, serving as the first editor from 1967. His wife Saro and daughter Suganya joined Naicker in exile, and Saro also worked for Sechaba. Naicker worked with activists who worked to establish an ANC office in New Delhi, India, to organise the distribution of Sechaba to international readers in India.

Naicker became a member of the International Organisation of Journalists (IOJ) committee. In 1971, was awarded their gold pin and in 1976 he was awarded the Julius Fucik medal for outstanding services to journalism.

== Death ==
Naicker died suddenly on 29 April 1977. He died from a suspected heart failure during a flight from England to Germany. He was travelling to deliver ANC publicity material for printing.

He was buried at the Golders Green Crematorium in London. At his funeral there were tributes from the Acting President of the ANC, Oliver Tambo; the Chairman of the SACP, Yusuf Dadoo; and activist Brian Bunting. The ANC choir sang "Nkosi Sikelel'i Afrika."
