= Dora Tamana =

South African anti-apartheid activist (1901–1983)

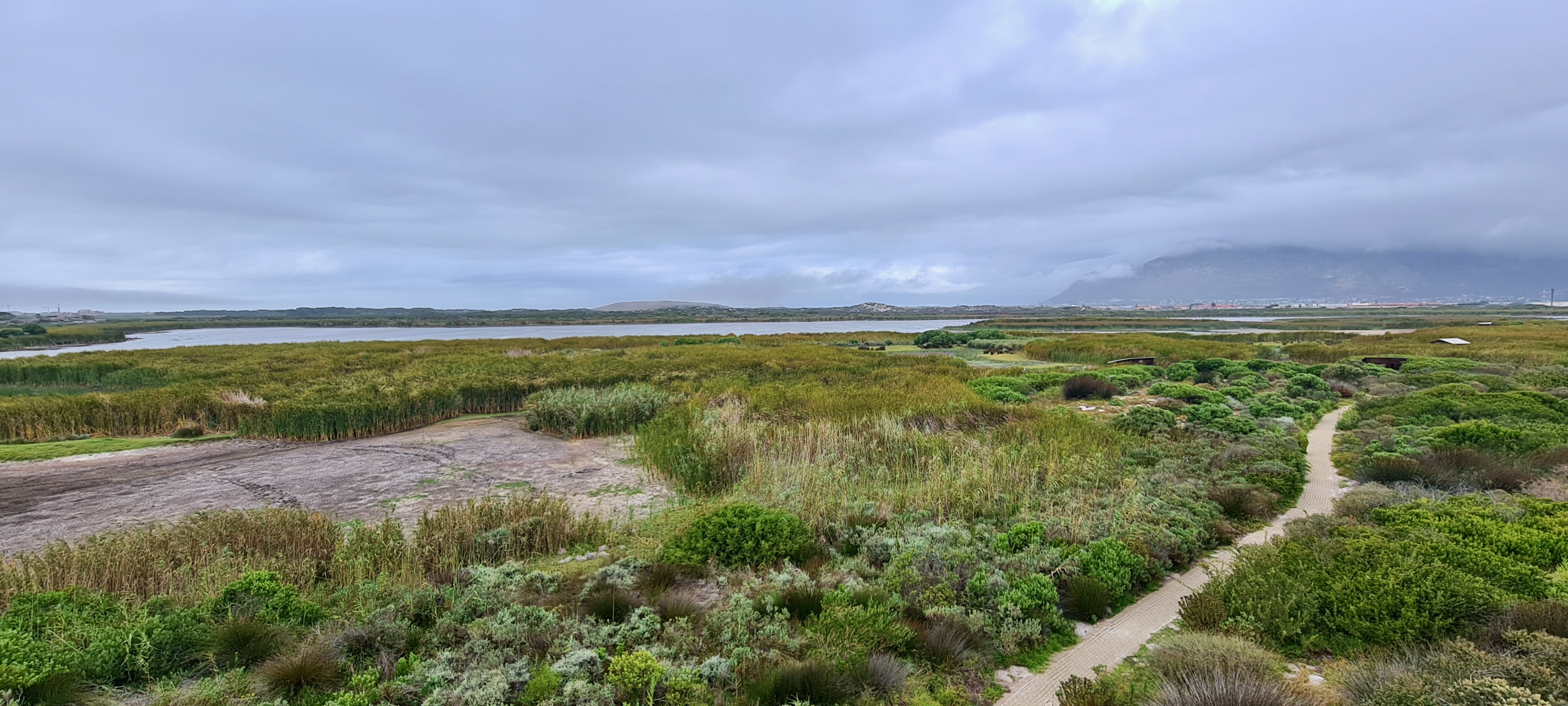
In 2015, a dedication was made in Rondevlei, Cape Town within a public park, officially named after Dora Tamana in honor of her legacy regarding social change and equity among Southern Africans.

Dora Ntloko Tamana OLG (11 November 1901 – 23 July 1983) was a prominent South African anti-apartheid activist known for her unwavering commitment to social justice, equality and gender issues. Her life and work were dedicated to challenging the oppressive apartheid regime in South Africa. Her experiences with the injustices perpetrated under apartheid fueled her determination to fight for society where all individuals would be treated equally regardless of race or background. Tamana's efforts contributed to the eventual dismantling of apartheid in South Africa, and challenged rigid gender expectations assented by many in power.

== Early life (1901–1921) ==
Dora Ntloko Tamana was born in 1901 to parents Minah and Joel Ntloko. She was the eldest of four children. She described her childhood as a picture of somber and isolation, in an untouched community of Hlobo, Transkei, then part of Cape Colony. Critically, Hlobo was under colonial rule, and faced land dispossession with major migrant labour pressures and missionary schooling influence. Tamana's education consisted of attending school until the fourth standard at 10 years old, however she was mainly self-educated due to education being limited for Black children under colonial education policy. Much of her life consisted of living and working on her family's land, where they worked together to look after their cattle and do household chores. As a teen Dora and her family converted to the Israelite denomination, a black church that believed in Jewish and Old Testament ideals. The movement in particular was a syncretic African-initiated church, which followed ideals dedicated to land settlement, self-governance, and separation from colonial authority. This religious group began to inhabit an area called Ntabelanga. The South African government thought of this as illegal occupation of land and this led to the 1921 Bulhoek Massacre of Israelite sect members. The violent confrontation of the massacre between colonial police and members of Israelites movement in the Eastern Cape, resulted in 100 deaths of the followers, including Tamana's father. This massacre and her loss inspired her activism and fight against South African apartheid.

== Career (1930–1981) ==
Dora Tamana's particular interest in activism centered around self-help programs such as a food committee (Cape Town's Women's Food Committee), a women's sewing cooperative, and a childcare program, which sought to have local authorities provide ample supplies. The program was extremely useful during World War II when the Women's Food Committee pressured the government to bring those in need aid, especially among working-class communities. She advanced women's struggles and organized her community and women in defiance campaigns against laws that limited people's movement. Specifically, the 1952 defiance campaign launched by the African National Congress (ANC), which held a mass civil disobedience against apartheid laws.

Additionally, Tamana joined a number of other political organizations as part of her activism. During World War II, she lived in the Blouvlei settlement, where she became politically active with the Cape Flats Distress Association (CAFDA), a group dedicated to improving poor living conditions for African and other communities. She was an executive member here where she set up vegetable gardens, and arranged for deliveries of fresh milk for the people in the settlements. She joined the Communist Party in South Africa (CPSA) during this time, and soon the African National Congress Women's League (ANCWL), which was created after women were allowed to join the congress. The league was used as a platform for Black South African women to advocate for national liberation and the anti-apartheid movement. Tamana very apparently participated in a series a campaigns that worked against pass laws and other forms of discrimination, catering to her broader resistance efforts in terms of social and political equity.

=== Communist Party of South Africa (CPSA) and African National Congress Women's League (ANCWL). ===
She became involved with the Communist Party of South Africa, which was banned in 1950 then later reconstructed as the South African Communist Party (SACP) in 1953 and met many prominent figures like Ray Alexander, someone who would become very close to her. This movement focused on issues related to housing and rent. She officially joined in 1942 as an executive member. As part of the Athlone committee for Nursery Education in the Blouvlei settlement in Cape Town, Dora Tamana was able to create nurseries for children while simultaneously creating economic opportunities for women to provide for their families. A community that held a reputation for a shortage in housing and poor sanitation due to lack of resources. The women of this committee were involved in establishing several schools in disadvantaged areas and they also founded the Maynardville Open-Air Theatre on December 1, 1950 (as a fundraiser for welfare and community projects ). Dora Tamana was joined by two other ladies from that committee, fellow Communist Party member Jean Bernadt and Athlone committee chair Margaret Molteno, to build a school and health centre in Blouvlei. The three women worked to realize Dora Tamana's vision and they founded the Blouvlei Nursery School and family health centre in May 1955.

While living in Blouvlei she became more politically active, especially through the South African Communist Party (SACP). In her career, Dora Tamana eventually went on to take higher roles in the African National Congress Women's League (ANCWL). One of her first jobs was going door to door to encourage people to protest against the National Party, a party that caused problems for African Americans through highly restricted legislation. Her political career reached its height when she became acting Secretary. She understood what it meant to come from a poor, rural and working class family. She would describe her political journey as a slow burn that further inflamed as she spent more time with people, learning from them.

=== Federation of South African Women (FEDSAW) ===
It was through Ray Alexander, one of the founders of FEDSAW, in the CPSA where Dora Tamana was able to fully become involved in the anti-apartheid movement. She took a leadership role in the anti-pass movement in 1953, and in 1954 became National Secretary of the Federation of South African Women (FEDSAW). One of her first memorable actions in this role was giving the inaugural conference speech. FEDSAW had international relationships with the WIDF, which allowed her to go to the World Congress of Mothers in Lausanne, Switzerland in 1955. Although Tamana's work was vital, she is not inherently recognized as a founding member of FEDSAW in many major sources, she is instead noticed as a fundamental organizer, especially in terms of social class workers.

=== World Congress of Mothers 1955 ===
The Federation of South African Women chose two delegates to attend the Congress of Mothers organized by the Women's International Democratic Federation (WIDF) in 1955. Dora Tamana accompanies fellow delegate and founder of FEDSAW, Lilian Ngoyi to the Congress. The journey to the Congress of Mothers was not easy. Neither she nor Ngoyi had official passports since it was hard for women associated within this work to obtain one. Tamana and Ngoyi stowed away on a boat leaving Cape Town for Britain under false identities. They had constant anxiety during their entire trip as they were often stopped and asked for papers. They would lie and say that they are accompanying their husbands for bible classes in London, and went under alias identities; specifically, "white names." Lausanne was their primary destination but the two FEDSAW delegates were able to travel together to other locations like Germany, Switzerland, Romania, China, and Russia. Traveling to other places enables the two to immerse themselves in leftist discourse. But in 1955, after attending the World Congress of Mothers in Switzerland with Lillian Ngoyi, she was banned by the South African government from attending political meetings for five years.

=== Relationship with Lilian Ngoyi ===
Dora Tamana's relationship with Lilian Ngoyi reflected an aligned partnership within the Federation of South African Women that worked endlessly to bridge communities, and national leadership. While Ngoyi maintained a prominent public figure imagery, Tamana's labor was deeply rooted into community-level organizing, making these two women quite complementary for one another. Both had a large emphasis on the political significance of both caregiving and a domestic life, framing vital issues such as food insecurities, housing and childcare as central topics of resistance. Their partnered involvement in an international forum situated Black South African women within global anti-colonial and leftist movements.

=== Life after the Congress of Mothers ===
Harassed by police and rezoned out of Blouvlei, she moved to Nyanga, where she remained for the rest of her life. In her sixties, she served two jail sentences for her activism, and her son Bothwell was imprisoned and sentenced to death, which was later changed to life imprisonment (he was later released, after Zimbabwe's independence). But she stayed actively involved with women's protests into the 1970s. In 1978 she organized a rally in Cape Town that established the United Women's Association which was the forerunner for an organization that was later made, the United Women's Organization. In her eighties, both blind and in a wheel chair, she spoke at the launching meeting of the United Women's Organization in 1981. Her opening speech and poem exhorted the next generations of South African women to unite and act together for change:

"We must share our problems so that we can solve them together. We must free ourselves. Men and women must share housework...must work together in the home and out in the world. Women must unite to fight for...rights. We have opened the way for you. We must go forward!"

You who have no words, speak.
You who have no homes, speak.
You who have no schools, speak.
You who have to run like chickens from the vulture, speak.
Let us share our problems so that we can solve them together.
We must free ourselves.

=== Influence on urban life and activism ===
Like mentioned before, Dora Tamana's influence in terms of urban life and activism extends deeply into working-class Black residents, particularly townships like the Cape Flats. Among the many mobilization she undertook, she organized aid around food insecurity, loss wages, and labor rights. Her efforts specifically reflect the realties of urban poverty under apartheid. Likewise, her emphasis on labor activism and women's movements was closely intertwined with the development of grassroots in terms of political consciousness, particularly among ordinary people. Scholar later have described her work as an element of a wider tradition of "African motherhood" politics, where nurturing and resistance are deeply tangled within one another.

While her work was enormous during apartheid, Tamana's involvement among the Black working class was remarkable. Simultaneously facilitating a foundation for mass urban resistance, while also fighting against apartheid.

== Personal life ==
After her father's death, Dora Ntloko had moved to Queenstown by the 1930s. She married John Tamana, with whom she had four children with, but only one survived infancy. She was considered a mother to a number of children, most of whom were her sister's. After some time, Dora and her husband moved to Cape Town after spending a long time apart. Soon after, the two divorced and John Tamana tragically passed due to alcoholism, while Dora began to look after her sister's children. Dora Tamana died in 1983, at age 82, from tuberculosis in Cape Town.

== Memorials and legacy ==
In 2015, a dedication done by a Southern African government official, Deputy Minister Nomaindia Mfeketo was made in Rondevlei, Cape Town within a public park. It was officially named after Dora Tamana in honorary of her legacy regarding social change and equity among Southern Africans.

Her efforts were also recognized on a level of academic commemorations, where Safundi: The Journal of South African and American Studies has published her work and analyzed her, by way of activism throughout the apartheid regime. Tamana's legacy has been preserved at a scholarly level, examining both her transnational activism and her work among the African women's political movement.
