= Order of Luthuli =

South African award

- Badge of the order
- Type: Civil order
- Awarded for: Contributions to the struggle for democracy, human rights, nation-building, justice, peace and conflict resolution.
- Country: South Africa
- Presented by: The President of South Africa
- Established: 30 November 2003

The Order of Luthuli is a South African honour. It was instituted on 30 November 2003 and is awarded by the President of South Africa for contributions to the struggle for democracy, human rights, nation-building, justice, or peace and conflict resolution.

The order is named after former African National Congress leader Chief Albert Luthuli, who was South Africa's first Nobel Peace Prize winner.

== Classes ==
The Order of Luthuli has three classes:

- Gold (OLG), for exceptional contributions,
- Silver (OLS), for excellent contributions,
- Bronze (OLB), for outstanding contributions.

== Symbols ==
The badge of the order is an equilateral triangle representing a flintstone above a clay pot. The flintstone depicts the sun rising above Isandhlwana, and the national flag, and it is flanked by two animal horns rising out of the clay pot, which bears the initials AL. Isandhlwana symbolises peace and tranquillity, and the leopardskin bands around the bases of the horns represent Chief Luthuli's headdress. The South African coat of arms is displayed on the reverse.

The ribbon is gold with a stripe of cream-coloured AL monograms down each edge, and recurring cream-coloured outlines of the flintstone, depicting the national flag, down the centre. All three classes are worn around the neck.

== Members ==
Members of the Order of Luthuli (2003–2023)
Year	Member	Class	Notes	Citation
2003	Mosell Molaoa	Gold	Posthumous	
2003	John Nkadimeng	Gold		
2003	Alfred Nzo	Gold	Posthumous	
2003	Mary Burton	Silver		
2003	Willie Esterhuyse	Silver		
2003	Matthew Goniwe	Silver	Posthumous	
2003	Mthuli ka Shezi	Silver	Posthumous	
2003	Winnie Kgware	Silver	Posthumous	
2003	Jafta Masemola	Silver	Posthumous	
2003	Lekgau Mathabathe	Silver	Posthumous	
2003	Phyllis Naidoo	Silver		
2003	Albert Nolan	Silver		
2003	Jasmat Nanabhai	Bronze		
2004	Hilda Bernstein	Gold		
2004	Z. K. Matthews	Gold	Posthumous	
2004	Thomas Nkobi	Gold	Posthumous	
2004	Sol Plaatje	Gold	Posthumous	
2004	Laloo Chiba	Silver		
2004	Clarence Makwetu	Silver		
2004	Mapetla Mohapi	Silver	Posthumous	
2004	Josie Mpama	Silver	Posthumous	
2004	Billy Nair	Silver		
2004	Rita Ndzanga	Silver		
2004	Joe Nhlanhla	Silver		
2004	Reggie September	Silver		
2004	Dan Tloome	Silver	Posthumous	
2004	Steve Tshwete	Silver	Posthumous	
2004	Amina Cachalia	Bronze		
2004	Frans Rasimphi Tshivhase	Bronze	Posthumous	
2005	Flag Marutle Boshielo	Gold		
2005	John Dube	Gold	Posthumous	
2005	Anton Lembede	Gold	Posthumous	
2005	I. B. Tabata	Gold	Posthumous	
2005	Eddie Daniels	Silver		
2005	Frene Ginwala	Silver		
2005	Archie Gumede	Silver	Posthumous	
2005	Fish Keitseng	Silver	Posthumous	
2005	Kwedie Mzingisi Zilindile Mkalipi	Silver		
2005	Dullah Omar	Silver	Posthumous	
2005	Madimetja Laurence Phokanoka	Silver		
2005	Mildred Ramakaba-Lesiea	Silver		
2005	Archie Sibeko	Silver		
2005	Christmas Fihla Tinto	Silver		
2005	Dorothy Nomazotsho Zihlangu	Silver	Posthumous	
2006	Joe Gqabi	Silver	Posthumous	
2006	Fort Calata	Silver	Posthumous	
2006	Ike Maphotho	Silver		
2006	Amina Pahad	Silver	Posthumous	
2006	Albie Sachs	Silver		
2006	Ama Naidoo	Silver	Posthumous	
2006	Pixley Seme	Silver	Posthumous	
2006	Sicelo Mhlauli	Silver	Posthumous	
2006	Anthony Sampson	Silver	Posthumous	
2006	John Tengo Jabavu	Silver	Posthumous	
2006	Sparrow Mkhonto	Silver	Posthumous	
2007	Gert Sibande	Gold	Posthumous	
2007	Florence Mophosho	Silver	Posthumous	
2007	Johnny Makatini	Silver	Posthumous	
2007	Mfanasekaya Pearce Linda Gqobose	Silver		
2007	Monty Naicker	Silver	Posthumous	
2007	John James Issel	Bronze		
2007	Emma Mashinini	Bronze		
2007	Rica Hodgson	Bronze		
2008	James Calata	Gold	Posthumous	
2008	Robert Resha	Gold	Posthumous	
2008	Walter Rubusana	Gold	Posthumous	
2008	Himan Bernadt	Silver	Posthumous	
2008	Bertha Gxowa	Silver		
2008	Josiah Jele	Silver		
2008	Zollie Malindi	Silver		
2008	Barbara Masekela	Silver		
2008	Nana Henrietta Moabi	Silver		
2008	Billy Modise	Silver		
2008	Griffiths Mxenge and Victoria Mxenge	Silver	Posthumous	
2008	Maggie Resha	Silver	Posthumous	
2008	Chanderdeo George Sewpershad	Silver	Posthumous	
2008	Vesta Smith	Silver		
2009	Brian Bunting	Silver	Posthumous	
2009	Tlou Theophilus Cholo	Silver		
2009	Denis Goldberg	Silver		
2009	James Arnold (Jimmy) la Guma	Silver	Posthumous	
2009	Rebecca Makgomo Masilela	Silver	Posthumous	
2009	Kader Asmal	Bronze		
2009	Jacqueline Daane-van Rensburg	Bronze		
2009	Bibi Dawood (Yusuf Mukadam)	Bronze		
2009	Mirriam Hlazo	Bronze		
2009	Lydia Komape-Ngwenya	Bronze		
2009	Nomhlangano Beauty Mkhize	Bronze		
2009	James Mpanza	Gold	Posthumous	
2009	Peter Nchabeleng	Gold	Posthumous	
2009	Johannes Phungula	Gold	Posthumous	
2009	David Rabkin	Silver	Posthumous	
2009	Dulcie September	Silver	Posthumous	
2009	Simon Senna	Silver		
2009	Ahmed Timol	Silver	Posthumous	
2009	Sina Keitsing	Bronze		
2009	Nokuhamba Nyawo	Bronze		
2010	Stephen Dlamini	Gold		
2010	Sonia Bunting	Silver	Posthumous	
2010	Dot Cleminshaw	Silver		
2010	Jameson Nongolozi Mngomezulu	Silver		
2010	Mzala Nxumalo	Silver	Posthumous	
2010	Randolph Vigne	Silver		
2011	Rusty Bernstein	Gold	Posthumous	
2011	Nelson Diale	Silver		
2011	Ismael Chota Meer	Silver		
2011	Florence Elizabeth Mnumzana	Silver		
2011	Harriet Bolton	Bronze		
2011	Margaret Gazo	Bronze		
2011	Tsietsi Mashinini	Bronze	Posthumous	
2011	Violet Sarah Matlou (née Phiri)	Bronze		
2012	Josiah Gumede	Gold	Posthumous	
2012	Zaccheus Mahabane	Gold	Posthumous	
2012	Sefako Makgatho	Gold	Posthumous	
2012	James Moroka	Gold	Posthumous	
2012	Alfred Xuma	Gold	Posthumous	
2012	John Stephen Gomas	Silver	Posthumous	
2012	Bettie du Toit	Silver	Posthumous	
2012	Fenner Christian Kadalie	Silver	Posthumous	
2012	Peter Mokaba	Silver	Posthumous	
2013	Nkosazana Dlamini-Zuma	Gold		
2013	Neville Alexander	Silver	Posthumous	
2013	Amina Desai	Silver	Posthumous	
2013	Michael Alan Harmel	Silver	Posthumous	
2013	Essop Jassat	Silver		
2013	Arthur Letele	Silver	Posthumous	
2013	Mosibudi Mangena	Silver		
2013	David Fani Mncube	Silver		
2013	Moosa Moolla	Silver		
2013	Elias Phakane Moretsele	Silver	Posthumous	
2013	Richard Mothupi	Silver		
2013	Nomazizi Mtshotshisa	Bronze	Posthumous	
2014	Frances Baard	Gold	Posthumous	
2014	David Wilcox Hlahane Bopape	Gold	Posthumous	
2014	Ruth First	Gold	Posthumous	
2014	Abdullah Haron	Gold	Posthumous	
2014	Bob Hepple	Gold		
2014	Florence Matomela	Gold	Posthumous	
2014	Zephania Lekoane Mothopeng	Gold	Posthumous	
2014	Abdhulhay Jassat	Silver		
2014	Wolfie Kodesh	Silver	Posthumous	
2014	Smangaliso Mkhatshwa	Silver		
2014	Popo Molefe	Silver		
2014	Agnes Msimang	Silver		
2014	Jeanette Schoon	Silver	Posthumous	
2014	Zola Skweyiya	Silver		
2014	Mittah Seperepere	Bronze	Posthumous	
2015	William Henry Frankel	Silver		
2015	Johnson Malcomess Mgabela	Silver	Posthumous	
2015	Jabulile Nyawose	Silver	Posthumous	
2015	Petros Nyawose	Silver	Posthumous	
2015	Mohammed Tikly	Silver		
2015	Kay Moonsamy	Bronze		
2016	Cleopas Madoda Nsibande	Gold	Posthumous	
2016	Brian Francis Bishop	Silver	Posthumous	
2016	Msizi Harrison Dube	Silver	Posthumous	
2016	Simon Gqubule	Silver		
2016	Winnie Madikizela-Mandela	Silver		
2016	Mac Maharaj	Silver		
2016	Mary Thipe	Silver	Posthumous	
2016	Amy Rietstein Thornton	Silver		
2016	John Zikhali	Silver	Posthumous	
2016	Suliman “Babla” Saloojee	Bronze	Posthumous	
2017	The 22 ANC Political Trialists of 1969	Silver		
2017	Mamou Calata	Silver	Posthumous	
2017	David Mbulelo “Spi” Grootboom	Silver	Posthumous	
2017	Matsobane Morris Matsemela	Silver		
2017	Fatima Meer	Silver	Posthumous	
2017	Collen Monde Mkunqwana	Silver	Posthumous	
2017	Zodwa Mofokeng	Silver	Posthumous	
2017	Reggie Oliphant	Silver	Posthumous	
2017	Neville Rubin	Silver	Posthumous	
2017	Zweli Lucas Sizani	Silver	Posthumous	
2018	Mhlabunzima Joseph Maphumulo	Gold	Posthumous	
2018	Dikgang Moseneke	Gold		
2018	Godfrey Kenneth Beck	Silver	Posthumous	
2018	Sylvia Benjamin	Bronze	Posthumous	
2018	Ronald Bernickow	Bronze	Posthumous	
2018	Lilian Diedricks	Silver		
2018	Farid Esack	Silver		
2018	Mary Fitzgerald	Silver	Posthumous	
2018	Swami Gounden	Silver		
2018	Charles Hooper	Silver	Posthumous	
2018	Sibongile Mkhabela	Silver		
2018	Keith Mokoape	Silver		
2018	Mojo Motau	Silver		
2018	Rahima Moosa	Silver	Posthumous	
2018	Veronica Sobukwe	Silver		
2018	Dora Tamana	Gold	Posthumous	
2019	Thandi Lujabe-Rankoe	Silver		
2019	Velaphi Msane	Silver		
2019	Tony Trew	Silver		
2019	Moyisile Douglas Tyutyu	Silver		
2019	Yosuf Veriava	Silver		
2023	Ethel de Keyser	Gold	Posthumous	
2023	Ebrahim Ismail Ebrahim	Gold	Posthumous	
2023	Molly Blackburn	Silver	Posthumous	
2023	Moki Cekisani	Silver		
2024	Kenneth Hlako Rachidi	Gold	Posthumous	
2024	Peter Cyril Jones	Gold	Posthumous	
2024	Mxolisi “Dicky” Jacobs	Gold	Posthumous	
2024	Benjamin Langa	Gold	Posthumous	
2024	Thobekile “Tobsy” Madaka	Gold	Posthumous	
2024	Siphiwo Mthimkhulu	Gold	Posthumous	
2024	Harry Ranwedzi Nengwekhulu	Gold		
2024	Annie Silinga	Gold	Posthumous	
2024	Nokuthula Simelane	Gold	Posthumous	
2026	Jack Simons	Gold	Posthumous	
2026	Ray Alexander Simons	Gold	Posthumous	
2026	Mmagauta Molefe	Silver		
2026	Caiphus Nyoka	Silver	Posthumous	
2026	Adele Kirst	Bronze		

== See also ==
- South African civil honours
