= Johannes Phungula =

South African politician

Johannes Phungula OLG

Member of the National Assembly
- In office 23 April 2004 – May 2009

Personal details
- Born: 15 March 1932 Ixopo, Natal Province; Union of South Africa
- Died: 9 August 2009 (aged 77)
- Party: African National Congress
- Nickname: Pass Four

Johannes Phumani Phungula (15 March 1932 – 9 August 2009) was a South African politician and former anti-apartheid activist who represented the African National Congress (ANC) in the National Assembly from 2004 to 2009. A veteran of the Defiance Campaign, he joined the ANC in 1952 and spent several decades as an underground operative for Umkhonto we Sizwe in rural Natal, working closely with Jacob Zuma. He was awarded the Order of Luthuli in Gold posthumously in December 2009.

== Early life and activism ==
Phungula was born on 15 March 1932. He grew up in Hlokozi near Ixopo on the South Coast of the former Natal Province. He joined the ANC in 1952 at the height of the Defiance Campaign, which he joined as a volunteer while working at Joko Tea in Durban. He was a union organiser at his workplace and in 1959 was deployed by the ANC to his hometown, where he was tasked with carrying out political education and recruitment among rural communities. During that period he helped mobilise women to protest against the pass laws and other apartheid legislation. In 1960, he was sentenced to two years' imprisonment for his political activity, particularly his opposition to the new Bantu Authorities in the South Coast.

== Umkhonto we Sizwe: 1962–1993 ==
Upon his release in 1962, he resumed his political activity – although the ANC had by then been banned by the government – and was recruited into Umkhonto we Sizwe (MK). As an underground ANC operative, he worked closely with Jacob Zuma, who later became President of South Africa; Zuma was also an underground operative in Natal and later ran MK's command in neighbouring Swaziland.

In 1976, as state repression intensified, Zuma arranged for Phungula to leave the country and enter exile; he received military training in the Soviet Union and then was made a military commander for an MK cell deployed to Natal. He also spent time at MK camps in Tanzania and Mozambique, including at the Solomon Mahlangu Freedom College. Among his ANC comrades, he was known as "Pass Four" – either in reference to the knock-off time for workers who sought to avoid the attention of policemen coming on duty, or in reference to a personal mantra that enemies should be attacked after four p.m. when they are relaxing.

== Parliament: 2004–2009 ==
In the 2004 general election, Phungula was elected to an ANC seat in the National Assembly. He served a full term in the legislature, retiring after the 2009 general election.

== Personal life and death ==
Phungula died on 9 August 2009. Zuma delivered the eulogy and also delivered a memorial speech in 2019 on the ten-year anniversary of his death.

He was married and had two wives, in line with traditional Zulu polygamy.

== Honours ==
In December 2009, in his capacity as President, Zuma awarded Phungula the Order of Luthuli in Gold "for his exceptional contribution to the trade unions and political struggle against apartheid". In 2022, the council of Ubuhlebezwe Local Municipality, which subsumed Ixopo after apartheid, announced that it had decided to rename the municipality after Phungula.
