= Mittah Seperepere =

South African activist (1929–2010)

Mittah Seperepere OLB

Member of the National Assembly
- In office May 1994 – June 1999

Personal details
- Born: Mittah Selekanyana Goieman; 1929 Cape Province, Union of South Africa
- Died: 30 October 2010 (aged 80–81)
- Party: African National Congress
- Spouse: Maruping Seperepere (died 1981)

Mittah Selekanyana Seperepere (née Goieman; 1929 – 30 October 2010) was a South African anti-apartheid activist from the Northern Cape. A veteran of the African National Congress (ANC) and its Women's League, she lived in exile from 1966 until the abolition of apartheid in 1994. Thereafter she represented the ANC in the National Assembly from 1994 to 1999.

== Early life and activism ==
Seperepere was born in 1929 in the present-day Northern Cape and attended school in Majeng, now part of Magareng Local Municipality. She joined the ANC Youth League in the 1940s and was secretary of the ANC's branch in Galeshewe. She was also active in the ANC Women's League, particularly in women's protests against the pass laws. Her activism continued after the party was banned by the apartheid government in 1960, and she was imprisoned on a political offence in 1965. Upon her release, she was incorporated into the underground of Umkhonto we Sizwe, the ANC's armed wing.

== Exile ==
In 1966, Seperepere and her husband left the country to evade the attention of the Security Branch. They spent time in Botswana before settling in Tanzania, where Seperepere sat on the ANC's regional political committee, served as an ANC welfare officer, and helped establish the primary school at the Solomon Mahlangu Freedom College. In 1981, she moved to Lusaka, Zambia, where the ANC was headquartered, and later that year, with Dulcie September, she represented the ANC Women's Section at the World Congress of Women for Equality, National Independence and Peace in Prague, Czechoslovakia. In 1989, she was appointed as the ANC's chief representative in Madagascar, Reunion, Seychelles, Mauritius and the Comoros.

== Legislative career ==
Seperepere returned to South Africa during the democratic transition and in South Africa's first post-apartheid elections in 1994, she was elected to represent the ANC in the National Assembly, the lower house of the South African Parliament. She served a single term in her seat; according to the ANC, she declined to seek re-election in 1999 on the grounds that younger people should be given the responsibility to advance the country's democracy.

== Personal life and death ==
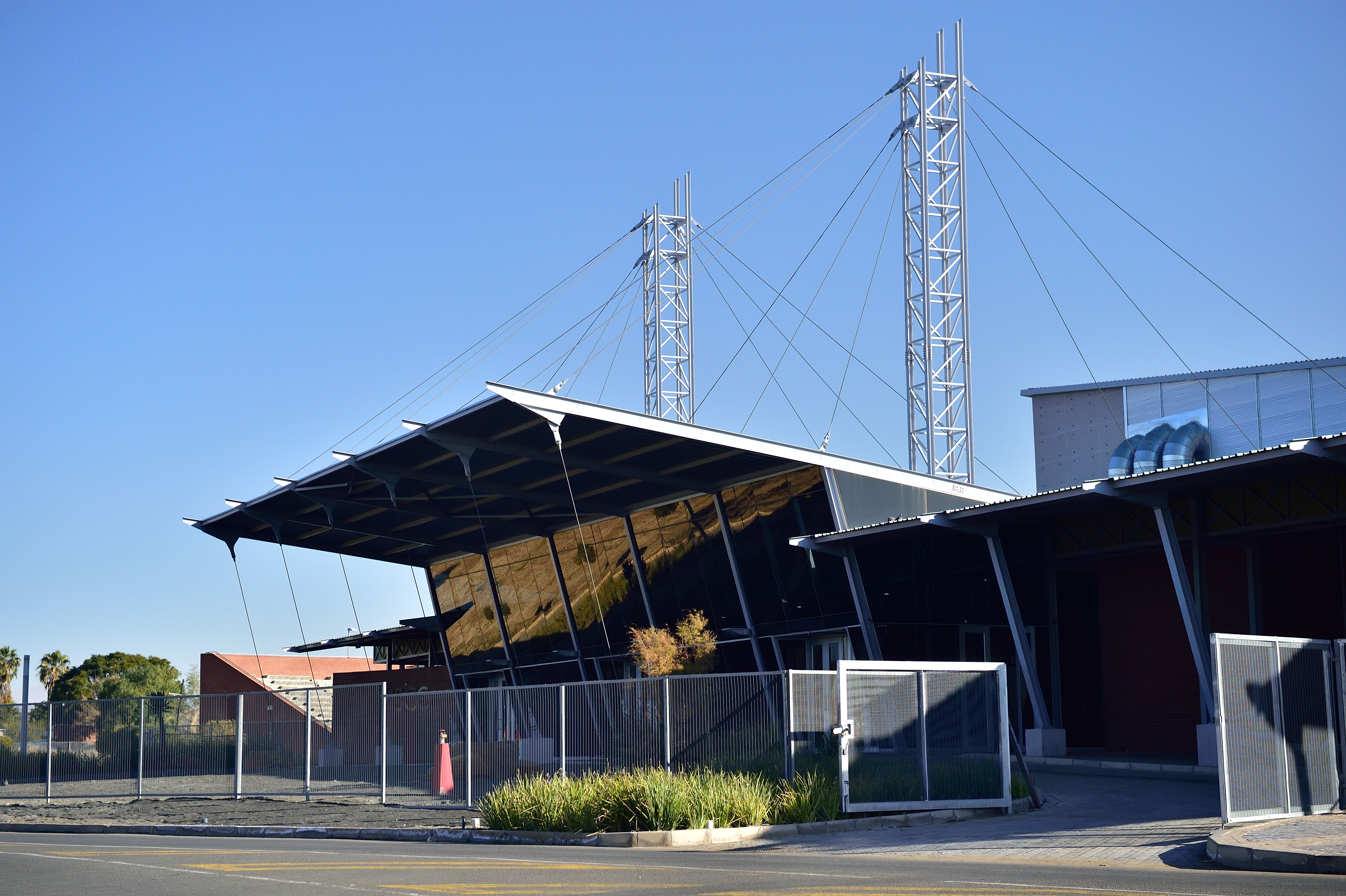
The Mittah Seperepere Convention Centre in Kimberley

Seperepere died on 30 October 2010. In 2012, Northern Cape Premier Hazel Jenkins opened the Mittah Seperepere Convention Centre in Kimberley, Northern Cape in her memory. President Jacob Zuma awarded her the Order of Luthuli in bronze in 2014 "for her excellent contribution to the fight against apartheid and serving the country with bravery, ensuring that all South Africans enjoy democracy".

She was married to Maruping Seperepere, who died in Tanzania in 1981.
