= Wolfie Kodesh =

South African politician (1918–2002)

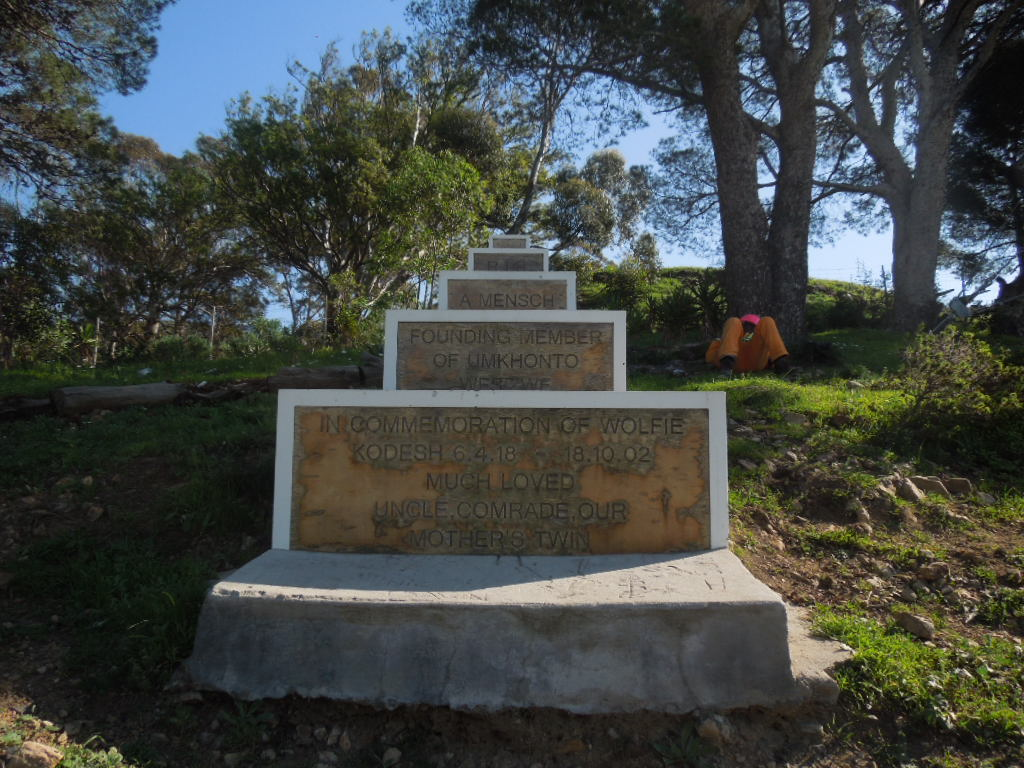
Commemoration of Wolfie Kodesh, Cape Town

Wolfie Kodesh OLS (April 6, 1918 – October 18, 2002) was a South African Communist Party activist. Kodesh was born in the Transvaal mining town of Benoni. He became involved with the South African Communist Party in 1938, selling the leftwing newspaper, the Guardian. During World War II, he fought in Italy and North Africa. In 1961, he hosted Nelson Mandela in his apartment while Mandela was evading apartheid-era authorities. At the time, he was working as a journalist at New Age, a leftist newspaper that would be shut down in 1962.

== Early life ==
Wolfie Kodesh's paternal grandparents arrived in South Africa after fleeing the pogroms in Eastern Europe. His mother, Fanny Shapiro, came from East End in London. His father ran a hansom cab business which collapsed during the great depression of the 1930s. After his parents separated, Wolfie, his twin sister and brother moved to Cape Town where they joined their mother.
