= Jessie Duarte =

South African politician (1953–2022)

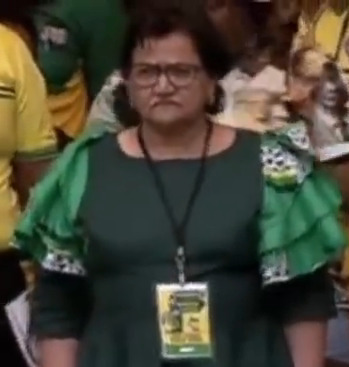
- Duarte at the 2019 election manifesto launch

Acting Secretary-General of the African National Congress
- In office 3 May 2021 – 17 July 2022 Serving with Paul Mashatile (19 January 2022)
- President: Cyril Ramaphosa
- Preceded by: Ace Magashule
- Succeeded by: Paul Mashatile (acting solely)

Deputy Secretary-General of the African National Congress
- In office 18 December 2012 – 17 July 2022
- President: Jacob Zuma
- Secretary-General: Gwede Mantashe; Ace Magashule (suspended)
- Preceded by: Thandi Modise

National Spokesperson of the African National Congress
- In office 2003 – February 2009
- President: Nelson Mandela; Thabo Mbeki; Jacob Zuma
- Succeeded by: Carl Niehaus

Ambassador of South Africa to Mozambique
- In office 1999–2003
- President: Nelson Mandela; Thabo Mbeki
- Succeeded by: Thandi Lujabe-Rankoe

Personal details
- Born: Yasmin Dangor; 19 September 1953 Johannesburg, Transvaal, Union of South Africa
- Died: 17 July 2022 (aged 68) Johannesburg, Gauteng, Republic of South Africa
- Party: African National Congress
- Occupation: Politician; diplomat; civil servant; anti-apartheid activist
- Profession: Management accountant

Yasmin "Jessie" Duarte (née Dangor; 19 September 1953 – 17 July 2022) was a South African politician and acting secretary-general of the African National Congress. A longtime anti-apartheid activist, she served variously as a special assistant to Nelson Mandela, a member of the provincial cabinet (MEC) for Gauteng, as ambassador to Mozambique, and as spokesperson for the ANC, before assuming her post as Deputy Secretary-General of the ANC in 2012, until her death on 17 July 2022.

== Early life and career ==
Yasmin Dangor was born on 19 September 1953 in Coronationville on Johannesburg's West Rand and grew up in nearby Westbury and Newclare. One of nine children to Julie and Ebrahim Dangor, she was the sister of the poet and activist Achmat Dangor.

After matriculation from Coronationville Secondary School in Johannesburg, Duarte started her professional career as a management accountant. By 1979, she was recruited by Albertina Sisulu to set up women’s structures throughout South Africa. Two years later, in 1981, she served in the position of secretary of the Federation of Transvaal Women, an anti-apartheid organisation.

In 1988, she was detained without trial. She was subsequently placed under a banning order until the lifting of the prevailing state of emergency. Around that time she was working with Reverend Beyers Naudé to set up a scholarship fund to educate anti-apartheid activists to become an effective corps of public servants. She worked for Ravan Press, a publishing company co-founded by Naudé.

== Political career ==
When Nelson Mandela was released from prison in 1990, he appointed Duarte to be one of his personal assistants, a position she held until he became President of South Africa in 1994. She also assisted Walter Sisulu in a similar capacity in the lead-up to South Africa's first democratic elections. She became involved in the leadership of the African National Congress (ANC) at a regional level and was elected to the Transvaal Provincial Executive Council (PEC), was appointed to the ANC's interim leadership core, and became the inaugural Member of the Executive Council (MEC) for Safety and Security in Gauteng. In 1997, she was elected to ANC's National Executive Committee.

In 1998, she was accused of taking her lover on a trip to Portugal at the taxpayers' expense, sparking a controversy on the possible misuse of public funds. She was subsequently forced to quit her position as Safety and Security MEC after a commission of inquiry reported a "strong suspicion" that she had covered up a car accident while driving without a licence. Duarte admitted to having driven a car without a license but maintained that it was people in her department who had put out the claim that it was a bodyguard driving at the time. The Mail & Guardian newspaper reported that she delivered the allegedly fraudulent document containing this claim to them in person.

Duarte then became a diplomat and served as the South African ambassador to Mozambique from 1999 to 2003.

She became a spokesperson for the ANC and until 2010 served as chief operations officer in the Presidency in the office of President Jacob Zuma. In 2009 she featured in the news for two recorded diatribes launched against journalists Philani Nombembe of the Sunday Times and John Humphrys of BBC Radio. She later voiced support for the ANC's plans for a Media Appeals Tribunal in South Africa which faced criticism as being political interference with free speech and possibly unconstitutional. Duarte blamed the media for portraying Jacob Zuma in a negative light; according to the Mail & Guardian, "her dislike for the media [was] an open secret.

In December 2012, she was elected as Deputy Secretary-General of the ANC during the party's 53rd National Conference held in Mangaung, Free State. She was re-elected for a second five-year term at ANC's next national conference in Nasrec, Gauteng in 2017. She took over as ANC's acting Secretary-General when the incumbent Ace Magashule was suspended due to his indictment for corruption in May 2021.

In 2014, Duarte publicly compared Israel's actions in the Gaza Strip and the West Bank to that of Nazi Germany. This drew strong rebukes from Jewish groups within South Africa.

In 2019, she accused the ANC, the majority ruling party in South Africa, of being "racist" and "tribalistic" towards members and voters who are not black Africans.

In 2020 Jessie Duarte wanted the justice minister to "address" the "influential role" of the chief justice at the Judicial Service Commission as she felt that the independent judiciary had too much power. In a letter dated 2 March 2020 she attempted to influence the selection process for a constitutional court judge. There is no evidence that her attempts to weaken the judiciary were successful.

On 7 January 2021, Duarte announced that she would be retiring as deputy secretary-general of the ANC at the party's next conference in 2022.

She was accused of being tolerant of corruption within government structures, and in April 2021 supported former President Zuma's claims that the Zondo Commission was discredited. Evidence given at the commission suggested that Duarte’s ex-husband, John Duarte, was one of the people who appeared in the evidence of money flows from contracts within the scope of the commission's investigation. Her son was also accused of receiving money from a company that was awarded government tenders.

In June 2021, months after a report implicating the Chinese government in using the Uyghur minority for forced labour inside sweat shops in northwest China, Duarte was quoted by China's state news service, Xinhua News Agency, as saying that China was a model for many developing countries to learn from in areas such as poverty eradication, economic growth and development in east China; Duarte believed that the approach upheld by the Chinese Communist Party resonated with the ANC and its principle of Batho Pele or "People First.".

== Personal life and death ==
She was married to John Duarte, with whom she had two children, and divorced in 2001.

In 2022, the African National Congress gave Jessie Duarte sick leave and she was away from her political duties for many months. After false claims of her death circulated on social media in the wake of her absence from public party events, Duarte revealed on 24 April 2022 that she had cancer. She died from cancer on 17 July 2022 at age 68. Her funeral was held in accordance with Muslim rites later that same day, with the eulogy delivered by President Cyril Ramaphosa; she was buried at Westpark Cemetery.
