= Arthur Letele =

South African politician

Arthur Elias Letele (2 October 1916 in Maseru, Basutoland – 20 December 1965) was a politician and physician in South Africa and Basutoland.

== Biography ==
Arthur Elias Letele was born on 2 October 1916 in Maseru, Lesotho. Shortly after his birth, the family moved to the South African Ladybrand in the Free State. He first studied medicine at the South African Native College, and then at the University of the Witwatersrand in Johannesburg, before graduating as a physician in 1946. In 1944 he was in the Youth League of the African National Congress (ANC). In 1952 he participated in the Defiance Campaign against the apartheid regime and was detained several times. In 1953 he was elected to the National Executive Committee of the ANC.

In 1952 he participated in the Defiance Campaign against the apartheid regime and was detained several times. Because of incitement to violence, he received a prison sentence of nine months, which was suspended on probation. In 1953 he was elected to the National Executive Committee of the ANC. He went around Kimberley collecting the demands of residents in the lead up to the signing of the Freedom Charter. At the signing in Kliptown, he was vocal about a second clause in the charter, which stated that all men should be created equal before the law. In the same year he became treasurer of the ANC. The following year he was among the 156 defendants of the Treason Trial, but was acquitted. In 1960 he was imprisoned again because he was in Orlando where he publicly burnt his passport.

== Mayibuye Uprisings ==
The Defiance Campaign of 1952 marked the second anniversary of the National Day of Protest of 1950, where the government shot down 18 black people. The Campaign was organised by Nelson Mandela, with every town in South Africa called upon to defy apartheid and its laws. No. 2 Location was identified as the key area of protest in Kimberley. As local ANC branch chairperson, Dr. Letele was tasked with mobilising people from the area. On 7 November 1952 Protestors sat peacefully on benches legally designated for whites, and blocked the entrance to the post office. As a result, Dr. Letele and seven other leaders from No. 2 Location executive ANC branch were detained. Dr. Letele and the seven other arrested leaders were fined £3 or punished with 10 days imprisonment. All of them opted for imprisonment. In the same year he became treasurer of the ANC. The following year he was among the 156 defend. Alongside Dr. Letele, Sam Phakedi, Pepys Madibane, Olehile Sehume, Alexander Nkoane, Daniel Chabalala and David Mpiwa were accused of contravening the Suppression of Communism Act. In the same year he became treasurer of the ANC. The following year he was among the 156 defend. Protestors were outraged, and the next day at dawn, both public and private property in No. 2 Location was destroyed.

Later that day police barricaded a route that led to a petrol depot, which protesters intended to set alight. Some workers coming back home to No. 2 Location were innocently struck by the police. The police gunned down 13 people in this incident, wounding 78 others. Following the Defiance Campaign and the subsequent killings in No. 2 Location, black South Africans began taking a more concerted approach in fighting against apartheid policies that limited their movement and denied them the franchise.

== Death ==
Letele suffered from an incurable disease. On 20 December 1965, he died by suicide.

== Recognition ==
On 27 April 2013, Dr. Letele was awarded the Order of Luthuli in Silver posthumously by the South African presidency for his "dedication and excellent work in pursuing the liberation of the people of South Africa and Lesotho."

== See also ==
- Nelson Mandela
- Walter Sisulu
