= Sylvia Benjamin =

South African trade unionist (1939–2012)

Sylvia Benjamin OLB

Treasurer of the National Union of Mineworkers
- In office 1985–1987
- President: James Motlatsi
- General Secretary: Cyril Ramaphosa

Personal details
- Born: 15 November 1939 Bloemfontein, Orange Free State; Union of South Africa
- Died: 27 December 2012 (aged 73)
- Party: African National Congress
- Other political affiliations: South African Communist Party

Sylvia Motlagomang "Mamza" Benjamin (15 November 1939 – 27 December 2012) was a South African trade unionist and anti-apartheid activist. She was the treasurer of the National Union of Mineworkers from 1985 to 1987 and was the first woman to serve on the union's executive. After the end of apartheid, she represented the African National Congress (ANC) as a local councillor in Matlosana, North West from 1994 to 2005, and she was a member of the national executive of the ANC Veterans' League at the time of her death in 2012.

== Early life and career ==
Benjamin was born on 15 November 1939 in Bloemfontein. When she was two years old, her family moved to Klerksdorp, where her father, formerly a mineworker, became a successful businessman. She attended a Roman Catholic convent school in Venterspost before matriculating at Moroka High School in Thaba Nchu. After leaving school, she qualified as a beautician and opened a back-room beauty clinic and salon. She was also a beauty queen; her titles included Miss Klerksdorp, Miss World Newspaper, and Miss All Blacks Football Club.

== Union and political career ==
Benjamin had joined the African National Congress (ANC) in the 1950s, before it was banned by the apartheid government, but her political activism began in earnest after she took up work as an aptitude clerk at the Stilfontein gold mine in 1978. The poor working conditions for mineworkers at Stilfontein led her to trade union activism, and she was a founding member of the National Union of Mineworkers (NUM) in 1982. After a period as a shaft steward and recruiter, she was elected as NUM treasurer from 1985 to 1987. She was the first woman to serve on the NUM's executive committee.

Benjamin was involved in organising the mineworkers' strike of 1987, the largest in South Africa's history, and she was also involved in regional leadership structures of the United Democratic Front in the Western Transvaal. She was detained for her activism several times, and on one occasion she mounted a hunger strike while detained in Klerksdorp.

After anti-apartheid organisations were unbanned in 1990, Benjamin became active in the South African Communist Party (SACP) in the Western Transvaal. She was a member of the SACP provincial executive committee in the region (later renamed the North West) until 2007. She was also active in the regional ANC Women's League and represented the ANC as a local councillor in the City of Matlosana from 1994 to 2005. After her retirement, she helped found the Matlosana Senior Citizens' Association in 2006, and she was elected to the national executive committee of the ANC Veterans' League in 2010.

== Personal life and death ==
Benjamin was a single mother to three daughters, one of whom, an advocate named Elizabeth, died in 2007. Benjamin herself fell ill in 2011 and was in and out of hospital until she died on 27 December 2012. In April 2018, President Cyril Ramaphosa – the founding leader of the NUM – awarded her the Order of Luthuli in bronze for:

Her outstanding contribution to workers' rights and her gallant fight against injustice. She bravely embraced the cause of disenfranchised workers and women.

== See also ==
- Tripartite Alliance
