= Maynardville Open-Air Theatre =

Outdoor theatre in Cape Town, South Africa

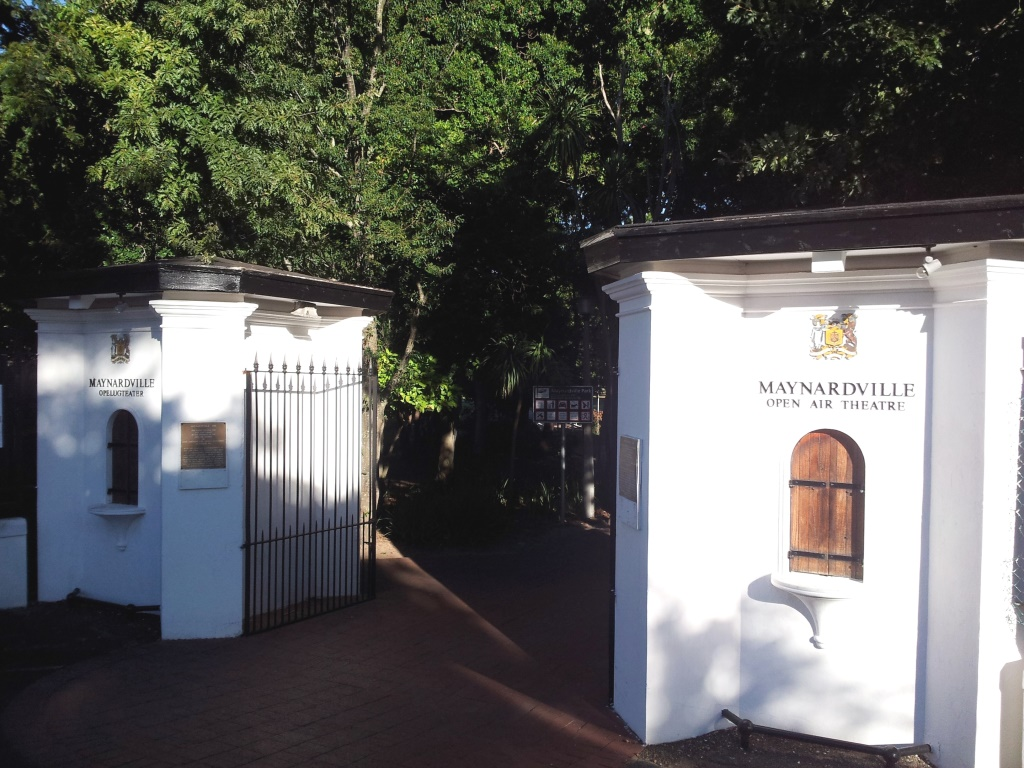
- Interactive map of Maynardville Open-Air Theatre
- Address: Piers Road, Wynberg; Cape Town; South Africa
- Coordinates: 34°00′19″S 18°27′51″E
- Owner: City of Cape Town
- Capacity: 720
- Type: Open-air theater
- Designation: Priority park

Construction
- Opened: 1949; 77 years ago

Website
- maynardville.co.za

The Maynardville Open-Air Theater is an outdoor theatre in Maynardville Park, Wynberg, Cape Town, South Africa. It seats 720 people and is known for its annual Shakespeare in the Park plays.

== History ==
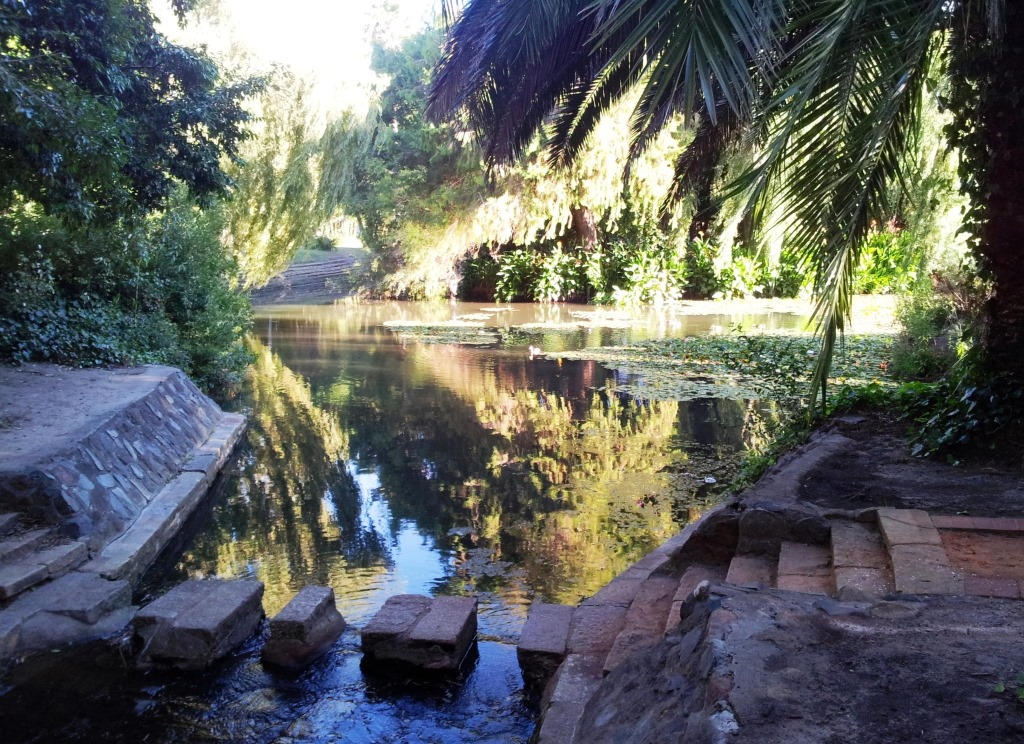
Park grounds of Maynardville with a section of the lake

=== Park grounds ===
Before it was named Maynardville, the land where the park now sits was government ground, first administered by the Dutch East India Company and, after 1795, by other British authorities. In July 1807 two young officers of the Cape regiment, Lieut. Louis Ellert and Lieut. Ernst Egger, married two sisters named Gertruida and Catherina Baartman. Just prior to his marriage, Ellert was granted a piece of land adjacent to the camp, where he built a cottage named Rosendal. The uneven ground was levelled and cultivated by slaves on either side of a stream known as the Krakeelwater, which flowed through the small estate. For several years Ellert and his wife shared the house with her sister and husband until, in 1810, Egger decided to purchase a piece of ground adjacent to Rosendal for his own use. Ellert was later killed in the war on the eastern frontier of the Cape Colony, but because he had transferred ownership to his wife, the widow Ellert continued to manage her small farm after her husband's death.

Her brother-in-law was not so efficient in his farming operations and this, coupled with his extravagant life style, forced him into bankruptcy. His land was not lost to his family, however, because his sister-in law purchased his property. To do this and to support her large household, the widow Ellert took a bond on the property from a Cape Town businessman and member of parliament named James Mortimer Maynard.

In 1836, Maynard took over Rosendal from the widow Ellert, who had become insolvent. He later bought another property from her to make up the site for his home, Maynard's Villa. Maynard died on 9 September 1874. As he failed to produce an heir, his estate went to his nephew, William Mortimer Maynard Farmer, who was already an established business man.

Farmer married the daughter of Major Richard Wolfe, then resident magistrate and civil commissioner of Wynberg. Their daughter Enid married John Bernard, a major in the Royal Marines; they had two sons, Gerald and Brian. Enid Bernard died in 1949 and Maynardville was immediately sold to the Cape Town City Council, to be preserved as a public park. The historic but dilapidated homestead was demolished by the municipal authorities in 1954.

=== Theatre ===
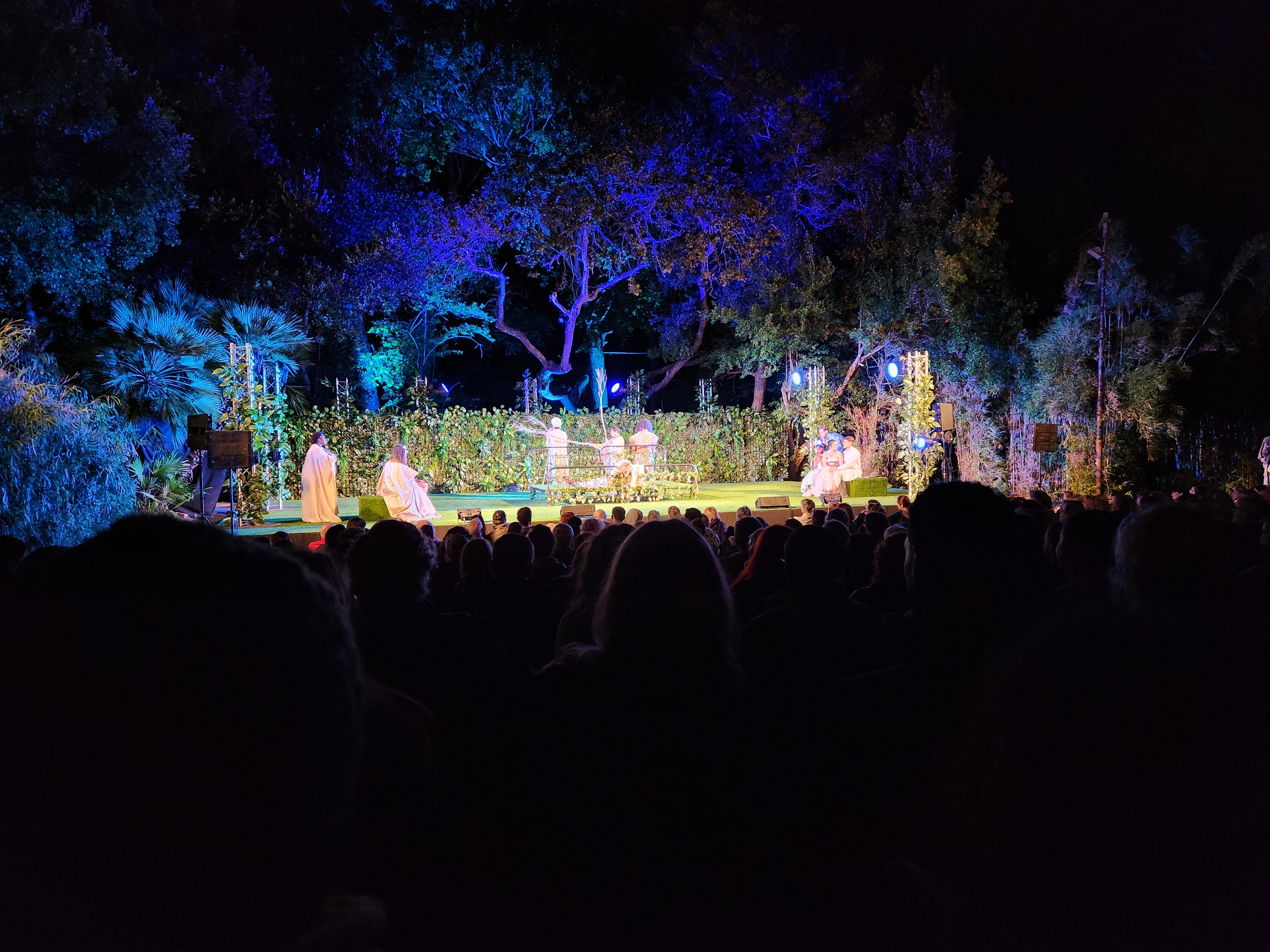
A night time performance at the Open-Air theatre.

The theatre had its origins in late 1949, when a local philanthropist, Margaret Molteno, submitted an application for municipal permission to convert the little-used park into an open-air theatre for dance performances. She had been inspired by a recent visit to Regents Park Open-air Theatre in London, and intended to use the project as a means of funding schools and teacher-training colleges for underprivileged children on the Cape Flats. She chaired the Athlone Committee for Nursery Education, which was a group of women who conducted charity projects in underprivileged areas. The open-air theatre was first established by a small group of members from this committee, including Jean Bernadt, Dulcie Cooper, Ann Harris, Margaret McKenzie, Margaret Molteno and Lorna Thompson. A successful approach to the then Mayor of Cape Town, Mr Abe Bloomberg, resulted in permission to use the premises. The Athlone ladies had the grounds overhauled, and facilitated the pro bono services of the Municipal Orchestra, Principal Dulcie Howes of the UCT Ballet School and Dean Erik Chisholm of the College of Music as conductor.

The open-air theatre officially began operation from the evening of 1 December 1950, with the successful performances of Les Sylphides, St Valentine's Night and Les Diversions. The money raised from this and later performances went to fund a pre-primary school in Athlone as well as the establishment of the Athlone Teachers' Training College – the country's first college for coloured teachers of pre-school children. Another supported community project was the Blouvlei Nursery School, which was built by Dora Tamana, Jean Bernadt and Margaret Molteno of the Athlone Committee, under Mrs Tamana's direction, and opened in May 1955. (Note: Athlone Training College was established under the auspices of Barkly Training College for Nursery Education. Structural alterations were undertaken and courses began in February 1952.) Unusually for South Africa at the time, Maynardville had also been preserved as "Open to All" and free from segregation. This was one reason why the venue was chosen. Several of the founding committee members were members of the Black Sash, the South African Communist Party or other strongly anti-apartheid organisations. The organisers and first audiences were also multiracial.

In 1953, instead of organising the annual ballet performance, Mrs Molteno approached the well-known South African actresses Cecilia Sonnenberg and Rene Ahrenson, and invited them to establish Shakespearean seasons. The actresses were first uncertain and then declined the invitation later that year. The dance performances therefore began again in 1954 with Don Quixote and Carnaval performed on a wooden stage situated where the seating of the modern stage is now located. The reason for situating the stage in the north-west corner of the park was that since 1952 the badly dilapidated Maynard villa could no longer be used for routing electricity for the stage. The Athlone ladies found that they could access electricity directly from the street poles at the intersection of Church and Wolfe streets and so the stage needed to be close enough to be within reach of their cables.

In 1955 Mrs Ahrenson and Mrs Sonnenberg finally agreed to accept the project and they enlisted the support of the Councillor A.Z. Berman for the necessary infrastructure. The Athlone Committee now stopped their annual dance performances to work on supporting the Shakespearean preparations being led by the two actresses. The organisers soon had a new and renovated stage and a raked auditorium. Mrs Ahrenson and Mrs Sonnenberg contacted Leslie French, an English stage and film actor, whom they had invited to South Africa only months before, to come to Cape Town to direct and act in the theatre's first play. It was chosen to be The Taming of the Shrew.

The performance of The Taming of the Shrew on 29 January 1956 was a notable success. The two actresses themselves performed leading roles in this and later productions. In 1957 the theatre opened again in the usual location but with the larger dimensions it has occupied ever since. In February 1958 the Maynardville Open Air Theatre was finally declared a permanent institution by the Cape Town City Council. After the Shakespearean seasons were fully established, the ballet performances were begun again, and both were run in parallel ever since.

In the following years, the Shakespearean seasons grew into an annual tradition of "Shakespeare-in-the-Park". After decades of serving as the public face of the theatre, Cecilia and Rene retired in the mid-1990s, and most of the theatre's drama department closed when they left. However, the park still maintains its dance performances and Shakespeare series through the Maynardville Theatre Trust, which was created after Cecilia retired.

Performance chronology (1950 to present)

(Plays are overseen by the Maynardville Theatre Trust, along with Artscape, while ballets were managed and run by the CAPAB Ballet Company from 1963 and by Cape Town City Ballet from 2002.)

- 2015 Othello (play)
- 2015 La Sylphide (ballet)
- 2014 The Tragedy of King Richard III (play)
- 2014 The Firebird (ballet)
- 2013 Giselle (ballet)
- 2013 A Midsummer Night's Dream (play)
- 2012 The Comedy of Errors (play)
- 2012 Solitaire, Graduation Ball (ballet)
- 2011 The Taming of The Shrew (play)
- 2011 Night and Day (ballet)
- 2010 Les Sylphides, The Firebird (ballet)
- 2010 Anthony and Cleopatra (play)
- 2009 La Sylphide (ballet)
- 2009 As You Like It (play)
- 2008 The Merchant of Venice (play)
- 2008 Giselle (ballet)
- 2007 Romeo & Juliet (play)
- 2007 Ballets al Fresco (ballet)
- 2006 Twelfth Night (play)
- 2006 Carmen (ballet)
- 2005 Swan Lake (Act 2) (ballet)
- 2005 Much Ado about Nothing (play)
- 2004 Le Tricorne, The Lady and the Fool (ballet)
- 2004 Macbeth (play)
- 2003 Two Gentlemen of Verona (play)
- 2003 La Sylphide (ballet)
- 2002 Giselle (ballet)
- 2002 A Midsummer Night's Dream (play)
- 2001 Othello (play)
- 2000 Romeo & Juliet (play)
- 1999 As You Like It (play)
- 1998 Twelfth Night (play)
- 1997 The Winter's Tale (play)
- 1996 The Taming of The Shrew (play)
- 1995 A Midsummer Night's Dream (play)
- 1994 The Tempest (play)
- 1993 Two Gentlemen of Verona (play)
- 1992 The Merchant of Venice (play)
- 1991 Love's Labour's Lost (play)
- 1990 Much Ado About Nothing (play)
- 1989 Twelfth Night (play)
- 1988 Romeo & Juliet (play)
- 1987 Measure for Measure (play)
- 1987 Comedy of Errors (play)
- 1985 As You Like It (play)
- 1984 The Taming of the Shrew (play)
- 1983 The Tempest (play)
- 1982 Othello (play)
- 1981 A Midsummer Night's Dream (play)
- 1980 Romeo and Juliet (play)
- 1979 The Merchant of Venice (play)
- 1978 Twelfth Night (play)
- 1977 Much Ado About Nothing (play)
- 1976 Julius Caesar (play)
- 1975 Hamlet (play)
- 1974 Umabatha (play)
- 1974 Flower Festival in Genzano, The Firebird (ballet)
- 1973 The Tempest (play)
- 1973 Giselle (ballet)
- 1972 Sylvia (Act 3), Verklärte Nacht, Peter and the Wolf (ballet)
- 1972 Anthony and Cleopatra (play)
- 1971 The Winter's Tale (play)
- 1971 Coppélia Suite, A Midsummer Night's Dream (ballet)
- 1970 Othello (play)
- 1969 The Merry Wives of Windsor (play)
- 1969 Les Deux Pigeons (ballet)
- 1968 Swan Lake (ballet)
- 1968 Richard II (play)
- 1967 Le Tricorne, The Lady and the Fool (ballet)
- 1967 Macbeth (play)
- 1966 King Lear (play)
- 1965 The Taming of the Shrew (play)
- 1965 Giselle (ballet)
- 1964 Hamlet (play)
- 1964 A Midsummer Night's Dream (play)
- 1963 The Merchant of Venice (play)
- 1963 Petrushka (ballet)
- 1962 TheSleeping Beauty (ballet)
- 1962 Much Ado About Nothing (play)
- 1961 Twelfth Night (play)
- 1961 The Nutcracker, Blood Wedding (ballet)
- 1960 The Tempest (play)
- 1959 The Winter's Tale (play)
- 1958 The Firebird, Les Patineurs, Beauty and the Beast (ballet)
- 1958 As You Like It (play)
- 1957 A Midsummer Night's Dream (play)
- 1956 The Taming of the Shrew (play)
- 1954 Don Quixote (pas de deux), Carnaval (ballet)
- 1952 Le Lac de Cygnes (2nd Act), Giselle (ballet)
- 1951 Les Sylphides, St Valentine's Night, Amor Eterno (ballet)
- 1950 Les Sylphides, St Valentine's Night, Les Diversions (ballet)

== The park today ==
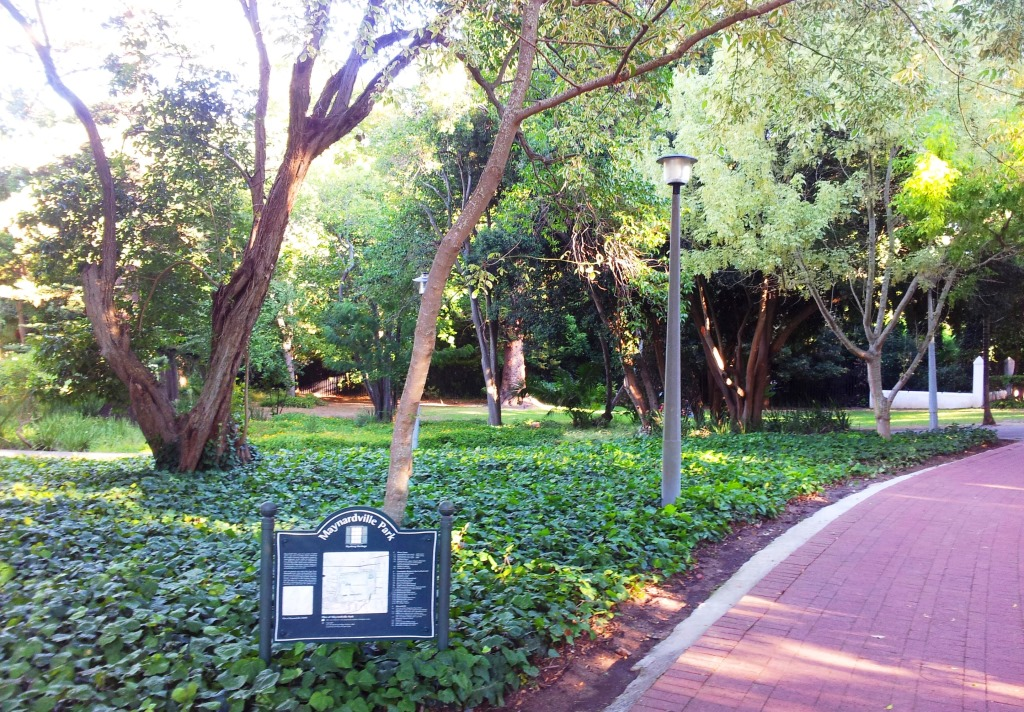

Maynardville has been designated as a "priority park" by the City of Cape Town, which means it has a development framework in place, spearheaded by the Maynardville Park Action Committee. This includes repairs to the facilities, incorporating the Wynberg library, creating a new gateway entrance, upgrading Rosendal Cottage, developing the historic avenue around Wolfe Street, and constructing a new pavilion.

== Citations ==
Notes

== Previous production reviews ==
- http://www.capetowntoday.co.za/Theatre/Maynardville/Twelfth_Night.htm
- http://www.fodors.com/world/africa-and-middle-east/south-africa/cape-town/review-108050.html
- http://www.alltheshows.co.za/events/index.php?com=detail&eID=5794&year=2008&month=1
- http://entertainment.bizcommunity.com/?p=84
- https://jillinthecape.blogspot.com/2008/02/merchant-of-venice-maynardville-in-dark.html
