= Sonia Bunting =

South African Journalist and political activist (1922-2001)

- Born: Sonia Beryl Isaacman; 9 December 1922; Johannesburg, South Africa
- Died: 24 March 2001 (aged 78); Cape Town, South Africa
- Other name: Sonia Beryl Bunting
- Occupations: journalist, political activist, human rights activist
- Years active: 1942–2001
- Known for: organizing the campaign to free Nelson Mandela

Sonia Bunting, OLS (9 December 1922 – 24 March 2001) was a South African journalist, and a political and anti-apartheid activist. After being charged with treason and imprisoned, being detained a second time, and barred from publishing, she and her husband went into exile in London, where she joined the Anti-Apartheid Movement (AAM) and organised the World Campaign for the Release of South African Political Prisoners. When the African National Congress (ANC) ban was lifted in 1991, she returned to South Africa where she was involved in political activism until her death in 2001. She was posthumously honored by the government of South Africa with the Order of Luthuli in Silver in 2010.

== Early life ==
Sonia Beryl Isaacman was born on 9 December 1922 in Johannesburg, South Africa to Dora and David Isaacman. Her parents were Jewish exiles, who had fled from Eastern Europe to escape anti-Semitic pogroms. After her matriculation from her secondary education, Isaacman enrolled at the University of the Witwatersrand to pursue medical studies. In 1942, while studying at university, she joined the Communist Party of South Africa (CPSA), the only multiracial political party in the country at that time. She began campaigning for universal suffrage and subsequently terminated her medical studies after completing one year of schooling.

== Career ==
Isaacman went to work in the offices of the SACP, where she met Brian Bunting, a young World War II veteran and fellow communist. In 1946, the couple married and they relocated to Cape Town, where their three children, Peter, Margaret and Stephen were born. Bunting continued working for the SACP there, and also began working at the Cape Town Peace Council as its secretary. When in 1950, Communism and the party were banned in South Africa, she began working at The Guardian, a newspaper with communist ties. When it was banned and renamed The Spark, and then subsequently banned and renamed New Age, she continued working for the paper. Appointed as a member of the delegation led by Ahmed Kathrada to represent South Africa, at the 3rd World Festival of Youth and Students, she traveled to East Berlin in 1951. In 1953, the party reorganized under the name of the South African Communist Party (SACP), and Bunting was one of its founding members. In reaction to increased restrictive legislation passed by the pro-Apartheid government, she focused on political activity. As a white woman, she was in a unique position to speak out against racial oppression. She was invited as one of the platform speakers at the 1955 Congress of the People held in Kliptown, where the Freedom Charter was adopted.

In 1956, Bunting, Kathrada, and 154 other activists were arrested and charged with high treason. The trial lasted until 29 March 1961, but Bunting was acquitted along with 91 others and returned to her home and children in October 1958. The year following her release, she was barred from attendance at meetings and forced to withdraw from twenty-six organizations with which she was affiliated. In March 1960 when the Sharpeville massacre occurred, Bunting was arrested again and held in the Pretoria Central Prison for more than three months. New Age was banned and closed in 1962, and all the journalists working there, which included Bunting, her husband, Ruth First and Govan Mbeki among others, were barred from publishing. She and her husband were placed under 24-hour house arrest for a five year period, making political activity impossible. The situation led the Buntings into deciding to leave South Africa for London in 1963. The exit visas for their exile stated that they could never return to South Africa.

Upon arrival in London, Bunting joined the Anti-Apartheid Movement (AAM) and continued her political work with the SACP. When Nelson Mandela was arrested, the World Campaign for the Release of South African Political Prisoners was established with Bunting as its organizer. She mobilized efforts to place economic sanctions on South Africa and isolate the country from the world economy, as well as headed up the efforts to publicize the situation in South Africa and the plight of Mandela and other political prisoners. She has been widely credited and is most remembered for her role in organizing the campaign to save Mandela from the gallows when the Rivonia Trial took place. When the trial ended and the defendants were sentenced to prison, she continued to work for their release, through the only "operating office of the SACP in the world", which was headquartered at 39 Goodge Street, London. Simultaneously, in 1968, she began coordinating the publishing efforts of the African Communist, the quarterly journal of the SACP, while working full time at the Inkululeko Publications. For almost two decades, she engaged in all of these activities as well as speaking engagements aimed at a free South Africa and a world which recognized the human rights of people throughout the world.

In 1991, after twenty-eight years in exile, the couple returned to Cape Town, when the bans against the SACP and the African National Congress (ANC) were lifted. Bunting served for the ANC in the campaigns of the 1994 and 1999 elections and was one of the founders of the Cape Town Friends of Cuba, continuing her political activities until her death.

== Death and legacy ==
Bunting died on 24 March 2001 in Cape Town. In 2010 she was honored by President Jacob Zuma with the Silver Order of Luthuli for her commitment to racial equality, human rights and nation-building efforts in South Africa.
