= Jacqueline Daane-van Rensburg =

Anti-apartheid activist

- Born: 17 December 1937; Cape Town (Union of South Africa)
- Occupation: Activist

Jacqueline Daane-van Rensburg, born on 17 December 1937, in Cape Town, is a white South African involved in the internal resistance to apartheid. After adopting a mute black child and assisting black people on various occasions, she exiled herself to the Netherlands, and then to New Zealand, where she continued her fight.

She returned to South Africa in 2004.

== Biography ==
=== Youth and first actions ===
She was born on 17 December 1937, in Cape Town. Her troubles with the authorities began in 1956, when she adopted a mute black child and decided to send him to a specialized school in Worcester, a neighborhood in Cape Town. The police forced her to move, and additionally, her husband and she lost their jobs.

Settled in Claremont, she quickly faced trouble again. In 1958, she filed a complaint against a policeman after witnessing him beating a black man. Following these events, Daane-van Rensburg had to move again. In 1959, she helped an Indian person who had been hit by a car and received a warning from the Claremont police. The following year, the South African was held at gunpoint by the police after giving access to her water to black people during a demonstration.

=== Exile ===
She chose to go into exile in 1960 with her family and moved to the Netherlands, where she immediately contacted the anti-apartheid movement. Daane-van Rensburg then spent some time in New Zealand, where she organized anti-apartheid groups and was in contact with several of the country's prime ministers, particularly to work towards canceling the Springbok tour.

=== Return ===
After the end of apartheid, she was allowed to return to South Africa in 2004. On 27 March 2009, she received the Order of Luthuli for "her courageous stance against the apartheid government and her tireless campaign for the liberation of South Africa on international platforms".
