= Jabulile Nyawose =

South African trade unionist (died 1982)

- Died: 4 June 1982; Matsapha, Swaziland
- Occupations: Trade unionist; anti-apartheid activist
- Spouse: Petrus Nyawose
- Children: 4

Jabulile Nyawose (14 July 1948 – 4 June 1982) was a trade unionist and anti-apartheid activist in South Africa. Nyawose was killed in exile by a car bomb in an execution sanctioned by the South African government. She was posthumously honoured with a silver Order of Luthuli in 2015.

== Biography ==
Nyawose's family were activists and her father was involved in the African National Congress (ANC). Nyawose was married to Petrus Nyawose, and both were very involved with the Black Allied Workers Union (BAWU). The couple had four children together, the second youngest of whom often spent time at the BAWU headquarters. Later, in exile, they had a fourth child.

Nyawose was recruited to act as a contact for two cells of the underground ANC, one run by Dhaya Pillay and the other by Shadrack Maphumulo. When Maphumulo was arrested in 1977, Nyawose and others involved worried they would be found out. Nyawose and her family went into exile, first crossing in to Botswana and then moving to Swaziland. They joined the South African Congress of Trade Unions (SACTU) that was active in Swaziland.

On 4 June 1982, Nyawose and her husband were killed when a car bomb exploded outside their house in Matsapha, near Manzini, Swaziland. Their three children witnessed the explosion and one, Nonzamo, testified about their parents' death for the Truth and Reconciliation Commission. The death was found to be sanctioned by the South African Government.

Nyawose was posthumously awarded a silver Order of Luthuli in 2015.
