= Jean Bernadt =

South African anti-apartheid activist

Jean Bernadt (née Alkin) (19 May 1914 – 9 April 2011) was a South African anti-apartheid activist.

She was an active member of the Communist Party of South Africa (CPSA), the Congress of Democrats, the Federation of South African Women and the Black Sash among other institutions. In 1940 she married Himan (Himie) Bernadt and she had three children.

== Early life ==
Jean Bernadt (née Alkin) was born in Panevėžys, Lithuania on 19 May 1914. She was the eldest of four children. When Jean was about six years old, her family moved to South Africa. She matriculated at Cape Town High School in 1934.

In 1935 she became the secretary of the 'Left Book Club' , a club which organised monthly meetings between a group of anti-fascist socialists, made up of intellectuals and trade union leaders in Cape Town. Bernadt's connection to politics can be linked back to her joining of the South African Communist Party, then known as the Communist Party of South Africa.

== Education ==
1934 High School Cape Town

1936 New York University – studied American Literature

In 1936, Bernadt attended university as New York University. She studied American Literature. She formally joined the CPSA that same year, returning to Cape Town and working for the Guardian newspaper as a distributor and fundraiser.

== Activities ==
She was involved in a wide range of charity organisations, usually together with other women from the Black Sash and the Communist Party. She was a member of the Athlone Committee for Nursery Education. The Athlone Committee founded the first nursery school for Coloured children in Athlone in 1949 and also founded the Maynardville Open-Air Theatre on 1 December 1950 as a charity fund-raiser for underprivileged areas. Her and Margaret Molteno (chair and founder of the Athlone Committee) joined up with the Blouvlei community leader Dora Tamana in 1954 to work on community projects in the Blouvlei informal settlement. As far back as 1948, Tamana had started a community creche at a private house, but it had stopped after two and half years because of a lack of funding. The three women raised funds and established the Blouvlei Nursery School and family health centre according to Tamana's plans in May 1955. Additionally, she was an active member of the National Council of Women for Women in Athlone and the Congress of Democrats. Bernadt also attended a Women's International Democratic Federation conference in East Berlin, upon the request of Ray Alexander Simons.

She was under government banning orders from 1959 to 1964. Later she housed Nelson Mandela during his negotiations with the Apartheid government. In 1960 she was arrested and spent three months in jail. Bernadt played a key role in the establishment of Thembalethu, an organisation that focused on supporting physically disabled people. In the early 1960s, the Bernadts were under constant surveillance from the police.

== Personal life ==
She married Himan Bernadt, a lawyer who helped attend to Nelson Mandela's legal matters during his incarceration, in 1940. They had three children: Marion, Ian and Morris.

== Legacy ==
Jean Bernadt resided in Kenilworth, Cape Town until her death at the age of 96.

== Commemoration ==
In 2008, Jean Bernadt and her husband were commemorated and awarded the Order of Luthuli in silver for opposing racism and defending the anti-apartheid activists.

== See also ==
- List of people subject to banning orders under apartheid
