= Dot Cleminshaw =

South African activist (1922–2011)

Dot Cleminshaw OLS
- Born: Dorothy Mullany; 15 September 1922; Cape Town, Cape Province; Union of South Africa
- Died: 18 December 2011 (aged 89)
- Education: Ellerslie School; University of South Africa
- Political party: Liberal Party of South Africa
- Spouse: Harry Cleminshaw

Dorothy Cleminshaw (née Mullany; 15 September 1922 – 18 December 2011) was a South African civil rights activist and anti-apartheid activist. A member of the Liberal Party of South Africa, she was a prominent figure in the Black Sash in the Western Cape, known particularly for her research and advocacy on political detentions, abortion rights, and conscientious objection.

== Early life and education ==
Cleminshaw was born in Cape Town on 15 September 1922. At age 16, she matriculated from the Ellerslie School in Sea Point. She went on to attend the University of South Africa, graduating cum laude with a Bachelor of Arts.

== Activism and research ==
Cleminshaw worked as a secretary while attending university and she was a secretary in the Department of Defence in Pretoria during World War II. After the end of the war, she and her husband held leadership positions in the Cape Town branch of the Torch Commando, joining the organisation's protest against the apartheid government's Separate Representation of Voters Bill. She became an active member of the Civil Rights League and the Liberal Party of South Africa, in which capacity she joined the Defence and Aid Fund; she continued to pursue this variety of work, with the families of political prisoners, through the Black Sash, which she joined in 1963.

Cleminshaw's later career included stints working at the Institute of Race Relations, at Zonnebloem College, and at the South African Council of Higher Education under Bill Hoffenberg. Though not particularly religious herself, she was also involved in the Christian Institute. In addition to her support for political prisoners, she was known for her research and advocacy in respect of apartheid legislation, the right to abortion, and the End Conscription Campaign. She was arrested on several occasions, including as a witness before the 1972 Schlebusch Commission and as the distributor, with Reverend David Russell, of a controversial 1977 report on police brutality in Nyanga.

In late 1977, Cleminshaw and her husband were on holiday in the United States and Britain when South African activist Steve Biko was killed in police detention; Cleminshaw addressed audiences in both countries to awareness about deaths in South African detention. In 1981, she was convicted of possessing a banned collection of Biko's essays, I Write What I Like; she served a short sentence in Pollsmoor Prison before her conviction was overturned.

After the end of apartheid, Cleminshaw became involved in the non-profit Working Group on Reparations and the broader campaign for reparations for victims of apartheid-era human rights abuses. In 2003, she told the Mail & Guardian that she opposed a general amnesty for the perpetrators of such abuses, saying, "Maybe we should have had Nuremberg-style prosecutions, and put the blighters before court".

== Personal life and death ==
In the 1950s, she married Harry Cleminshaw, who predeceased her. They had children and grandchildren. She was partly debilitated by a major back surgery after 1982, but she continued her activism and also self-published memoirs of her involvement in the anti-conscription, anti-police brutality, and pro-abortion campaigns.

She lived in Newlands, Cape Town until, in her old age, she moved to live with her son and daughter-in-law. She died on 18 December 2011 after a lengthy illness.

== Honours ==
In 2002, Cleminshaw received an honorary Master of Social Science from the University of Cape Town for her contribution to human rights advocacy. In 2010, South African President Jacob Zuma awarded her the Order of Luthuli in Silver "for her excellent contribution to the struggle for an equal, just and democratic society".
