= Fish Keitseng =

Ntwaesele Thatayone Keitseng
- Born: Ntwaesele Thatayone Keitseng; January 21, 1923; Gangwaketse, Bechuanaland Protectorate
- Died: March 28, 2005 (aged 82); Gaborone, Botswana
- Other names: Fish; Robin Hood of Newclare
- Occupations: Trade union activist, politician
- Known for: Anti-apartheid activism, ANC underground network, Botswana opposition politics
- Political party: African National Congress; Botswana People's Party; Botswana Independence Party; Botswana National Front
- Movement: Anti-apartheid movement
- Awards: Order of Luthuli (Silver)

Ntwaesele Thatayone "Fish" Keitseng OLS (21 January 1923– 28 March 2005) was a Motswana trade union activist and politician. Keitseng was one of the defendants of the 1956 Treason Trial in South Africa. Following his expulsion from South Africa, Keitseng organized a network of safe routes for thousands of African National Congress activists heading north. He was also a prominent leader of the opposition inside Botswana.

== Early life ==
Fish Keitseng was born in Gangwaketse in 1923, the first son in the family. Keitseng migrated to neighbouring South Africa when he was 21 years old. In South Africa he began working in the mines. Lacking formal education, he learned to read by himself through newspapers. He was recruited to the African Mineworkers Union by the Transvaal African National Congress/Communist Party leader J. B. Marks. Marks became Keitseng's political mentor. In 1948 Keitseng joined the ANC. In 1949 he shifted his residence to Newclare (in Johannesburg). He began working in a factory, and became a leader of the ANC movement in Newclare. He was active during the 1952 Defiance Campaign.

== Newclare riots and treason trial ==
In 1956 was sentenced to one years' imprisonment, following an incident of popular retaliation against police that were arresting pass offenders. Keitseng led a group of people, freeing the pass offenders. Riots continued in Newclare for two days, and the violence only ebbed out after Keitseng turned himself in to the police (on the request of Nelson Mandela). Following this incident, he earned the nickname 'Robin Hood of Newclare'. He made an appeal to the Supreme Court, but lost it by mid-1957. Whilst in jail for the Newclare riots, Keitseng was charged as one of the defendants in the Treason Trial. Following the trial he was deported to Bechuanaland (present-day Botswana) in 1959.

== Safe-houses ==
In Bechuanaland Keitseng continued to help the ANC, establishing a network of safe routes for ANC cadres going abroad for political and military training. Thousands of people moved through Bechuanaland/Botswana through Keitseng's network. Many prominent ANC leaders were hosted by Keitseng at his safe-house in Lobatse, including Nelson Mandela and Thabo Mbeki. In October 1962 Keitseng was travelling through Southern Rhodesia with a group of 26 ANC youth activists (including Thabo Mbeki), heading towards Tanganyika. The group was arrested and were detained and tortured for six weeks. They were then transported out of the country, to be handed over to the South African authorities. However, Keitseng managed to smuggle out information about the movement to fellow activists. They, in turn, managed to persuade the British District Commissioner of Palapye to block the train and release the captives. In the same month the ANC held a clandestine congress in Keitseng's Lobatse safe-house. This meeting formally endorsed the new line of armed struggle against the Apartheid regime.

== Opposition politician ==
Keitseng also became active in opposition politics in Botswana, becoming a founding member of the Botswana People's Party and later the founder of the break-away group Botswana Independence Party. In 1965 he founded the Botswana National Front together with Kenneth Koma. Only once did Keitseng stand as a candidate in an election, being elected as councilor of Gaborone for the period of 1989 to 1993.

== Funeral and legacy ==
Keitseng died on 28 March 2005, following a long period of illness. Thousands of people took part in his funeral in Gaborone. ANC and BNF hymns were sung. Messages from the presidents of Botswana and South Africa were read. The event was covered by the SABC as well as Botswana media. A statement issued from the Office of the Presidency of Botswana in response to Keitseng's passing commented that "[t]hrough such local heroes like the late Comrade Fish the nations of Southern Africa today stand together as a region with a common soul and future destiny."

In April 2005 Keitseng was posthumously awarded the Order of Luthuli in Silver "[f]or his excellent leadership and contribution to the struggle for the ideals of a free, just and democratic South Africa", awarded by the President of South Africa. In August 2012 Keitseng's Lobatse safe house was declared a national monument.

Keitseng's biography, Comrade Fish, was released in 1999 by Pula Press, and is one of the first autobiographical accounts written by a non-royal Motswana. Based on extensive interviews conducted in 1996 and 1997 with Jeff Ramsay and Barry Morton, the book contains a lively insider view of the ANC underground movement, as well as other biographical details relating to his family life, experiences in migrant labor, as well as his activism in the trade union movement. A recent revised, open-source edition of this out-of-print book has now been released.
