= Mary Thipe =

Mary Thipe OLS (1917-1982) was a South African anti-apartheid and human rights activist who took part in the 1956 Women's March against apartheid pass laws, the South African potato boycott of 1959 and the Cato Manor Beer Hall boycott in the same year. Thipe was also the vice-chairperson of the Cato Manor branch of African National Congress Women's League (ANCWL) during the 1950s.

== Personal life ==
Mary Thipe was born in 1917 in a village called Ramhlakoane in the Matatiele district in the Eastern Cape, South Africa. She later moved to Umkhumbane in KwaZulu Natal and joined the liberation struggle in 1952. Thipe had six children, five daughters and one son. After joining the struggle for liberation, Thipe was arrested on numerous occasions, making it difficult to spend time with her children. In describing her upbringing, Thipe's daughter Maeketso said: "We were raised by our father and some of our neighbours because my mother was arrested so many times. Sometimes people would laugh at us telling us our mother was in jail. It was hard. My mother never ever had a good life." Thipe died of a stroke in 2002.

== Political work ==
Mary Thipe joined the ANC during the Defiance Campaign of 1952. Thipe went on to become vice-chairperson of the Cato Manor branch of the African National Congress Women's League (ANCWL). She took a train from Cato Manor, KwaZulu-Natal to Pretoria to join hundreds of women who marched against pass laws on August 9, 1956. In an interview with the SABC, Thipe's daughter Maeketso said her mother refused to own a pass. "One day they [apartheid police] came to our house. It was in the middle of the day and they came and wanted to see her dompass. She didn't have it and she told them that she would not carry it. They arrested her. She spent two weeks in jail," Maeketso said.

On 26 June 1959, Thipe and leaders of the ANC-aligned South African Congress of Trade Unions and Congress Alliance, launched the national potato boycott in response to the unsatisfactory working conditions of labourers in Bethal in the Eastern Transvaal, now known as Mpumalanga. Over 60, 000 people attended the launch of the boycott at Currie's Fountain in Durban. The boycott lasted until September 1959 after the farmers improved the conditions in the farms. The boycott is seen as one of the most successful boycotts led by the ANC and allies during the apartheid era. On 17 June 1959, women led by Thipe and Dorothy Nyembe attacked the Cato Manor beer hall, forced their way inside, beating the men drinking there and wrecking the place. Rioting continued the next day and beer halls in other parts of town were attacked. This riot was organised to stop men from drinking sorghum beer while their children and wives starved.

Thipe's political work caught the attention of the apartheid government. She was put under house arrest for 10 years which meant she could not attend church services, funeral services of her loved ones and was not allowed to be in the company of more than three people. Every Monday morning, Thipe was required to report at the Cato Manor police station. This did not stop the security branch from harassing her even in her house arrest.

She had trained her children that each time police came in the middle of the night, they would wake up and stand behind her. She had also trained them to look at the police in the eye and not flinch. When three of Thipe's children went into exile, the police intensified their terror on Thipe and her family. "They would come wake us up, wanting to know where our siblings are. When I went to college, they had someone keep tabs on me. They told me I am not allowed to participate in politics because my family was already in big trouble," said Thipe's daughter Maeketsi in an interview with SABC.

When the police threatened to find Thipe's grandson and kill him, she retorted by requesting that they bring his head back to her. She refused to show fear and flinch at their threats. Even in the house arrest Thipe found ways to continue her work with the ANCWL, organising funerals of fallen comrades.

== Legacy ==
Thipe is regarded as one of the women who were instrumental in the fight against apartheid in South Africa. A road in Durban is named after Thipe in honour of her work in the Chesterville and Ntuzuma townships of Durban. The Mary Thipe Scholarship, which seeks to help students from poor families was launched in honour of her political work in Umkhumbane, Cato Manor and Chesterville in 2001. In April 2015, she was awarded the Order of Luthuli in Silver for her contributions to the South African struggle for freedom.

== See also ==
- Beer Hall Boycott
- Women's March (South Africa)
