= Johannes Phumani Phungula Local Municipality =

Coordinates: 30°09′S 30°05′E

Johannes Phumani Phungula Ubuhlebezwe
- Local municipality
- Seal

- Location in KwaZulu-Natal
- Country: South Africa
- Province: KwaZulu-Natal
- District: Harry Gwala District
- Seat: Ixopo
- Wards: 13

Government
  - Type: Municipal council

Area
  - Total: 1,604 km^{2} (619 sq mi)

Population (2011)
  - Total: 101,691
  - Density: 63.40/km^{2} (164.2/sq mi)

Racial makeup (2011)
  - Black African: 97.5%
  - Coloured: 1.2%
  - Indian/Asian: 0.4%
  - White: 0.8%

First languages (2011)
  - Zulu: 91.6%
  - English: 3.1%
  - Xhosa: 1.6%
  - Southern Ndebele: 1.3%
  - Other: 2.4%
- Time zone: UTC+2 (SAST)
- Municipal code: KZN434

Johannes Phumani Phungula Municipality (Zulu: UMasipala iJohannes Phumani Phungula; formerly Ubuhlebezwe Local Municipality) is a local municipality within the Harry Gwala District Municipality, in the KwaZulu-Natal province of South Africa. It was renamed in May 2025 after ANC struggle veteran Johannes Phungula. The previous name, Ubuhlebezwe, is an isiZulu word meaning "the beauty of the land", derived from Alan Paton's novel, Cry, The Beloved Country.

== Main places ==
The 2001 census divided the municipality into the following main places:

Place	Code	Area (km^{2})	Population
Amakhuze	55101	40.53	4,726
Dlamini/Vusathina Mazulu	55102	19.13	3,532
Dunge	55103	47.70	2,666
Ikhwezi/Lokusa	55104	48.56	12,316
Ixopo	55105	6.24	8,434
Izimpethu Endlovu	55106	10.23	751
Mjoli/Mawushe(Sizwe Hlanganani)	55107	72.47	12,580
Nyuswa	55108	33.78	4,063
Shiyabanye/Nhlangwini	55109	85.96	11,476
Ukuthula	55111	20.04	10,208
Vukani	55112	55.92	9,804
Vumakwenza/Sangcwaba	55113	94.13	4,524
Remainder of the municipality	55110	1,091.78	16,873

== Politics ==
The municipal council consists of twenty-six members elected by mixed-member proportional representation. Thirteen councillors are elected by first-past-the-post voting in thirteen wards, while the remaining thirteen are chosen from party lists so that the total number of party representatives is proportional to the number of votes received.

In the election of 4 November 2026, the African National Congress (ANC) lost its majority, with the uMkhonto weSizwe Party (MKP) winning plurality of thirteen seats.

The following table shows the results of the election.

Party	Ward			List			Total seats
Party	Votes	%	Seats	Votes	%	Seats	Total seats
uMkhonto weSizwe Party	16,298	47.04	13	16,843	48.64	0	13
African National Congress	10,248	29.58	0	10,212	29.49	8	8
Inkatha Freedom Party	3,952	11.41	0	4,030	11.64	3	3
Democratic Alliance	1,259	3.63	0	1,303	3.76	1	1
Economic Freedom Fighters	803	2.32	0	809	2.34	1	1
Independent candidates	856	2.47	0				0
6 other parties	1,234	3.56	0	1,430	4.13	0	0
Total	34,650	100.00	13	34,627	100.00	13	26
Valid votes	34,650	97.84		34,627	97.90		
Invalid/blank votes	766	2.16		743	2.10		
Total votes	35,416	100.00		35,370	100.00		
Registered voters/turnout	62,183	56.95		62,183	56.88		
