= Bibi Dawood =

Anti-apartheid activist (1927–2014)

Bibi Dawood OLB
- Born: Ayesha Dawood; 31 January 1927; Worcester, Cape Province; Union of South Africa
- Died: 1 June 2014 (aged 87); Worcester, South Africa
- Other names: Asa
- Spouse: Yusuf Mukadam (m. 1961)

Ayesha "Bibi" Dawood (31 January 1927 – 1 June 2014) was a South African anti-apartheid activist from Worcester. She was an organiser of the Defiance Campaign and later became a Treason Triallist, before in 1968 she was exiled to India for over two decades.

== Life and activism ==
Dawood was born on 31 January 1927 in Worcester in the Cape Province. Her father was an Indian merchant who had immigrated to South Africa in 1899; her mother was Malay from Calvinia. Her political involvement began in 1951 when she helped organise a strike against pass laws in Worcester on 7 May 1951. The success of the strike led to the formation of the Worcester United Action Committee, an anti-apartheid residents' association, and Dawood became its secretary.

Dawood was a key organiser for the Defiance Campaign in the Western Cape region, and she was later involved in the 1955 Congress of the People and the 1956 Women's March. In the interim, she was charged with political offences on two occasions – first in 1954, leading to a suspended sentence in terms of the Suppression of Communism Act, and then in 1956 in the Treason Trial.

In 1968, Dawood and her family were deported to India due to her husband's immigration status. She reportedly refused to collaborate with the apartheid government in exchange for the right to remain in South Africa. They lived in the village of Sarwa near Mumbai until South Africa's democratic transition, when they returned to Worcester. Dawood was awarded the Order of Luthuli in Bronze for her anti-apartheid activism.

== Personal life and death ==
Dawood married Yusuf Mukadam in 1961 after he had deserted from the Indian Navy and entered South Africa illegally. They had several children.

She died on 1 June 2014 in Worcester and was buried according to Muslim rites.
