= Reggie Oliphant =

South African politician and activist (1948–2003)

Reggie Oliphant OLS

Member of the National Assembly
- In office until June 1999

Personal details
- Born: Reginald Oliphant; 17 January 1948 South Africa
- Died: 15 May 2003 (aged 55) Mitchells Plain, Cape Town; Western Cape, South Africa
- Manner of death: Assassination by gunshot
- Citizenship: South Africa
- Party: African National Congress

Reginald Oliphant (17 January 1948 – 15 May 2003) was a South African politician, journalist, and anti-apartheid activist. A teacher by profession, he rose to prominence in the civic movement of Oudtshoorn, where he founded a progressive community newspaper, Saamstaan. He was the Southern Cape chairperson of the United Democratic Front.

After the end of apartheid, Oliphant served briefly as deputy mayor of Oudtshoorn. He also briefly represented the African National Congress (ANC) in the National Assembly during the first democratic Parliament. He was assassinated on the Cape Flats in an attempted hijacking in May 2003.

== Early life and activism ==
Born on 17 January 1948, Oliphant was raised by his grandmother after both his parents died. A teacher by profession, he rose to political prominence as a civic activist in Bridgeton, a Coloured neighbourhood under the Oudtshoorn Local Municipality in the Cape Province. He was a founding member of the Bridgeton Civic Movement and a founder of and journalist for Saamstaan, a local newspaper in Oudtshoorn. He was also the chairperson of the United Democratic Front in the Southern Cape region.

As a result of his civic organising, he was frequently harassed by the apartheid government: he was detained without trial on several occasions, faced multiple banning orders, and on one occasion was transferred by authorities to teach at a school in the isolated town of Kenhardt. In 1990, when the ANC was unbanned by the apartheid government, Oliphant was unanimously elected as the inaugural chairperson of the party's newly established branch in Oudtshoorn.

== Post-apartheid career ==
After the first post-apartheid municipal elections in 1995, Oliphant was elected as deputy mayor of Oudtshoorn Local Municipality. After a brief tenure in that office, he joined an ANC seat in the National Assembly, where he filled a casual vacancy. Although he stood for re-election in 1999, he was ranked 143rd on the ANC's national party list and did not gain re-election. At the time of his death, he was a businessman, with interests in the fishing industry.

== Assassination and trial ==
On the night of 15 May 2003, Oliphant was shot in the head at close range while sitting in his car at an intersection in Mitchells Plain on the Cape Flats. He was pronounced dead at Groote Schuur Hospital shortly afterwards. His wife said that he had been travelling to Mitchells Plain for HIV/Aids community work.

=== Perpetrators ===
Eight people, allegedly members of the Jukkies and Home Boys gangs, were arrested within a week of Oliphant's murder. One of them, Nazeem Amien, was convicted of Oliphant's murder in February 2005 and was sentenced to life imprisonment. During Amien's trial, a state's witness had testified that Amien and others had been instructed by a gang leader to stead a red Toyota Corolla, like Oliphant's, for a Johannesburg drug dealer; Amien was also convicted of attempted hijacking.

== Personal life and honours ==
He was married to Elizabeth Oliphant, with whom he had four daughters and a son. In April 2017, President Jacob Zuma admitted him posthumously to the Order of Luthuli, awarding him the order in silver for "His excellent contribution to the fight against social injustices meted out against black people in South Africa".
