= Brian Bunting =

South African activist and journalist (1920–2008)

Brian Bunting OLS

Member of the National Assembly
- In office May 1994 – June 1999

Personal details
- Born: 9 April 1920 Johannesburg, Transvaal; Union of South Africa
- Died: 18 June 2008 (aged 88) Rondebosch, Cape Town; Republic of South Africa
- Party: African National Congress
- Other political affiliations: South African Communist Party
- Spouse: Sonia Bunting (m. 1946; died 2001)
- Parent: Sidney Bunting
- Education: Wits University

Brian Bunting (9 April 1920 – 18 June 2008) was a South African activist and journalist known as a stalwart of the South African Communist Party (SACP). He represented the African National Congress (ANC) in the National Assembly from 1994 to 1999.

Bunting was involved in the anti-apartheid movement in the 1950s and was briefly a native representative in the all-white House of Assembly from 1952 until 1953, when he was expelled for his communist affiliation. He went into exile in England from 1963 to 1991 to avoid state persecution. During that time, he wrote non-fiction books and edited the African Communist, the SACP's mouthpiece. He also spent several decades as a member of the Central Committee of the SACP.

== Early life and education ==
Bunting was born on 9 April 1920 in Johannesburg in the former Transvaal. His parents were communists and founding members of the Communist Party of South Africa (CPSA) in 1921; Jeremy Cronin later described Bunting's father, Sidney Bunting, as "the key early architect" of the party. He attended Jeppe High School in Johannesburg and matriculated early, at the age of 15. Thereafter he enrolled in a Bachelor of Arts at Wits University, where he edited a campus newspaper and served as president of the student representative council.

== Early journalism career: 1940–1963 ==
After he graduated from Wits in 1940, he worked as a journalist for the Rand Daily Mail and Sunday Times. He also formally joined the CPSA, although he said that he had always taken his membership for granted, having grown up in the party. He initially refused to fight in World War II, viewing it as an imperialistic war, but he enlisted after Germany invaded the Soviet Union in 1941. He served in the army's information service on the North African front.

After the war, Bunting was assistant national secretary of the Springbok Legion, an influential anti-fascist organisation for ex-servicemen, and edited its mouthpiece, Fighting Talk. He was briefly arrested during a strike by black mineworkers in 1946. Later the same year, he moved to Cape Town to work as assistant editor and then editor-in-chief of the CPSA's weekly newspaper, the Guardian, which was renowned for its progressive stance on race relations. When the Guardian was banned by the government, Bunting edited each of its several successor papers (the Clarion, People's World, Advance, New Age, and Spark), working with Ruth First, Govan Mbeki, and others.

However, in 1948, the staunchly anti-communist National Party had been brought to power on a platform of legislating apartheid. From 1952, Bunting personally was banned under the Suppression of Communism Act, which circumscribed his political activity and ability to publish. Bunting was involved in the dissolution of the CPSA and then its re-emergence underground as the South African Communist Party (SACP). In November 1952, he was elected as one of three "native representatives" in the House of Assembly, representing the non-white population of the Western Cape, but he was removed from his seat in October 1953; like his predecessor in the seat, Sam Kahn, he was expelled because of his communist membership.

In subsequent years, Bunting and his family faced tightening state repression: his wife was charged in the Treason Trial, and both she and Bunting were detained for five months after the 1960 Sharpeville massacre. The couple were placed under house arrest in 1962 and harassed by the Security Branch. As a result, they went into exile in London in 1963.

== Exile: 1963–1991 ==
For much of the next 28 years, the Buntings lived in north London near Highgate Cemetery (Karl Marx's resting place); their house became a meeting place for exiled South African communists, including SACP leader Yusuf Dadoo, Thabo Mbeki, and Ruth First and her husband Joe Slovo. Bunting worked for TASS, a Soviet news agency, and edited the African Communist, the official journal of the SACP. He also served on the Central Committee of the SACP, ultimately for over fifty years.

In addition, while in exile Bunting wrote and published two non-fiction books. The Rise of the South African Reich (1964) was, in James Zug's phrase, a "workmanlike examination of the origins and growth of the apartheid regime", while Moses Kotane: South African Revolutionary (1975) was "a bravura if biased history of the Communist Party marked as a biography of one of its leading officials" (Moses Kotane).

== Return to Parliament: 1994–1999 ==
Bunting and his family returned to South Africa in 1991, the year after the SACP was unbanned by the apartheid government during the negotiations to end apartheid. In South Africa's first post-apartheid elections in 1994, Bunting was elected to represent the African National Congress (ANC), the SACP's close ally, in the new multi-racial National Assembly. He thereby returned to the seat that he had been expelled from 41 years earlier. According to Jeremy Cronin, Bunting began his maiden speech in Parliament with the phrase, "As I was saying before I was so rudely interrupted..." He served a single term in the National Assembly, leaving after the 1999 general election.

During that period, at the SACP's 10th congress in 1998, Bunting, with Billy Nair, became the recipient of the SACP's inaugural Moses Kotane Award for outstanding service to the party and working class. Even after the fall of the Berlin Wall, Bunting remained not only a staunch communist but "an unreconstructed Stalinist, one of the last true believers in the Soviet Union"; those who knew him personally described him as stubborn and even severe in his adherence to his political principles.

== Personal life and death ==
Bunting married Sonia Isaacman on the day that he moved to Cape Town in 1946. They had three children before Sonia died in 2001.

His health deteriorated in mid-2007 and he died on 18 June 2008, aged 88, at home in Rondebosch, Cape Town. In 2009, Bunting was posthumously awarded the Order of Luthuli in Silver for "his excellent contribution to anti-apartheid literature and journalism and for his courage in exposing the evils of apartheid to the world".

== See also ==
- Ray Alexander
- Jack Simons
