= Mohammed Tikly =

South African educator and struggle veteran

Mohammed Tikly (7 July 1939, Pietersburg (now Polokwane) - 11 March 2020, Johannesburg) was a South African educator and struggle veteran. A member of the ANC, he spent over thirty years in exile in the UK, Tanzania and Zambia. He was a former director of the Solomon Mahlangu Freedom College (SOMAFCO) in Tanzania.

== Early life and education ==
Tikly was the son of Abdul Hamid, a trader, and Amina Salojee. His mother died when Tikly was quite young and he was brought up by his extended family along with his three sisters. He attended high school in Johannesburg where he joined a circle of students reading the writings of ANC leaders. While at school he joined the Transvaal Indian Youth Congress, an affiliate of the Transvaal Indian Congress (TIC). In 1959 he moved to Ireland to study medicine at Trinity College Dublin, however he left after two years for London to become more involved in the liberation struggle.

== Struggle years ==
In 1964 he joined other activists on a seven-day hunger strike outside South Africa House to draw attention to the Rivonia Trial. Their efforts in drawing international attention to the case were seen as instrumental in preventing the triallists, including Nelson Mandela, from receiving the death sentence for charges of treason. Tikly completed a degree in sociology from Middlesex Polytechnic in 1969. He qualified as a teacher in social studies and economics, teaching at a number of schools across London including William Penn School, Archway school and Islington 6th-form centre. In 1979 he worked under the Inner London Education Authority to found the Multicultural Education Advisory Group before founding a similar organisation in the borough of Haringey. In 1982 he was asked to take over the directorship of the Solomon Mahlangu Freedom College (SOMAFCO) in Tanzania by the ANC. In 1985 he then moved to Lusaka to work at ANC headquarters before returning to South Africa in 1990.

== South African years ==
On his return to South Africa Tikly was asked to head up the Batlagae Trust which aimed to assist in the reintegration of student exiles as they returned to South Africa. Tikly then worked in the national department of education until his retirement in 2000. Tikly had been a member of the ANC's Archives’ Committee and continued to be involved with the Archives at Fort Hare University. He was also a trustee of the Desmond Tutu Diversity Trust. He was awarded the Order of Luthuli (silver) in 2017 for his services to the struggle. He died on 11 March 2020 after a number of health issues including Parkinson's Disease.

== Personal life ==
Tikly married Clare Reid, a maths teacher and fellow activist, in 1964. They had four children together: Anna-Zohra, Ruweida, Adam and Leon; but divorced in 1995 after a long separation.
