= New Age (South African newspaper) =

Defunct South African newspaper

New Age was an influential leftist newspaper in Johannesburg operating from 1953 to 1962. It was formed with the co-operation of a number of left-wing groups in the area; New Age received the assets of the communist Jewish Worker's Club, which had been liquidated in 1948. The newspaper later received support from a committee of the anti-apartheid South African Students' Association.

From the start, New Age published fiction and poetry as well as journalism. The newspaper had a prize for fiction depicting the oppressions of apartheid, and introduced several important politically aware poets, most notably Keorapetse Kgositsile, who became the literary voice of the South African anti-apartheid movement while in exile in the United States.

Its journalists, such as Joe Nzingo Gqabi and Marimuthu Pragalathan Naicker were aligned with the African National Congress, particularly the older generation of the ANC leadership. It was sympathetic to labour movements and to militant leftists of all stripes. New Age was shut down by the government in 1962. The newspaper has now been brought back to life, in 2010, however the goals and style of the newspaper are different. It now mostly focuses on South African politics, and does not have any works of fiction or poetry.
