= Swami Gounden =

Anti-apartheid activist and trade unionist (1927–2021)

Swami Gounden OLS
- Born: Swaminathan Karuppa Gounden; 1927; Durban, Natal Province; Union of South Africa
- Died: 30 November 2021 (aged 93)
- Political party: African National Congress
- Other political affiliations: Natal Indian Congress; South African Communist Party

Swaminathan Karuppa "Swami" Gounden (1927 – 30 November 2021) was a South African trade unionist and anti-apartheid activist from Natal.

== Life and activism ==
Born in 1927 in Durban, Gounden entered politics through the trade union movement and joined the Communist Party of South Africa at Magazine Barracks in 1944. The following year, he was a member of the progressive faction of the Natal Indian Congress that installed Monty Naicker at the head of the congress, ousting its conservative incumbent leadership. He was active in the congress's passive resistance campaign against the so-called Ghetto Act.

He joined the African National Congress (ANC) in 1950 and participated in the 1952 Defiance Campaign and 1955 Congress of the People. Over the next five decades, he was active in civic organisations in Natal, notably residents' associations in Asherville and the United Democratic Front. In 2018, President Cyril Ramaphosa awarded him the Order of Luthuli in Silver, "For his life-long and courageous fight against apartheid oppression".

He died on 30 November 2021, aged 93, and was granted an official provincial funeral, at which KwaZulu-Natal Premier Sihle Zikalala delivered the eulogy.
