= Joe Gqabi =

South African politician

Joe Gqabi OLS
- Born: Joe Nzingo Gqabi; 6 April 1929; Aliwal North, Eastern Cape, South Africa
- Died: 31 July 1981 (aged 52); Salisbury (now Harare), Zimbabwe
- Resting place: Aliwal North
- Political party: African National Congress; South African Communist Party
- Awards: Order of Luthuli (Silver) (OLS)

Joe Nzingo Gqabi OLS (6 April 1929 – 31 July 1981) was a South African African National Congress activist who was the ANC's chief representative in Zimbabwe at the time of his assassination by the South African Defence Force in Harare (then Salisbury), Zimbabwe, in 1981.

== Early life ==
Gqabi was born on 6 April 1929 in Aliwal North in what is now known as Joe Gqabi District Municipality. His first language was Xhosa.

== Political activity ==
In the 1950s Gqabi was a journalist for New Age, during which time he was in frequent contact with ANC leader Walter Sisulu. As a member of the South African Communist Party and UMkhonto we Sizwe he was sent for guerilla training in China in the early 1960s. He was captured with 28 fellow members who were undergoing military training in Rhodesia and deported back to South Africa, where he was sentenced to two years' jail for leaving the country illegally and then ten years for crimes under the Sabotage Act, after which he was jailed at Robben Island.

He rejoined the ANC after being released from jail in 1975. In 1976 he became co-chairman, with Martin Ramokgadi, of the clandestine ANC organisation in Johannesburg, known as the Main Machinery. During this time, the South African security services attempted to assassinate him by placing a bomb in his car, but it was discovered before it could detonate. He was arrested again after the Soweto uprising (Oliver Tambo later asserted that he served as an intermediary between the ANC and the South African Students' Movement there) but the police, with little evidence, were unable to make a case against him. He was released in 1977, left for Botswana and then went to Zimbabwe after its independence in 1980.

== Death ==
He was assassinated by the South African Defence Force on 31 July 1981 in Ashdown Park, Salisbury (now Harare), Zimbabwe. His body was repatriated to South Africa in 2004 and he was reburied in Aliwal North on 16 December 2004.

== Honours ==
He was posthumously awarded the Order of Luthuli in silver by the South African government. The Joe Gqabi District Municipality was named in his honour.

- Order of Luthuli (Silver) (OLS)
