= Tlou Theophilus Cholo =

Tlou Theophilus Cholo was born in 1926 in Kgakana Village, Ga-Matlala, near Thaba (Polokwane West), in what is today Limpopo Province, South Africa. In 1948 Cholo became active in trade unions and joined the African National Congress (ANC) and was a founding member of the South African Congress of Trade Unions (SACTU) in the early 1950s.

Cholo was among the first volunteer cadres of Umkhonto we Sizwe (MK), the armed wing of the ANC and underwent military and naval training abroad, including in the then USSR and China.
