= Thandi Lujabe-Rankoe =

South African diplomat (born 1936)

Thandi Lujabe-Rankoe OLS

Personal details
- Born: 1936 (age 88–89); Eastern Cape, South Africa
- Political party: African National Congress

Thandi Lujabe-Rankoe (born 1936) is a South African career diplomat and former anti-apartheid activist. She worked for the African National Congress in exile during apartheid from 1961 to 1994. In the post-apartheid government, she served as South African ambassador in Tanzania, Botswana, and Mozambique between 1995 and 2009.

== Early life and exile ==
Lujabe-Rankoe was born in 1936 in the Eastern Cape. The African National Congress (ANC) was banned by the apartheid government in 1960, and Lujabe-Rankoe followed the party into exile the following year; she was stationed at interim exile headquarters in Dar es Salaam, Tanzania, where her tasks included typing for ANC president Oliver Tambo.

Over the next three decades, Lujabe-Rankoe held a variety of positions in the ANC, including as its chief representative in Oslo, Norway from 1988 to 1994 and as chairperson of the ANC Women's Section in the Botswana and Zimbabwe region. She returned to South Africa after 33 years in 1994 following that year's post-apartheid general election.

== Diplomatic career ==
In January 1995, President Nelson Mandela designated Lujabe-Rankoe as the first post-apartheid South African High Commissioner to Tanzania; she established the South African High Commission there. After four years, she was appointed as High Commissioner to Botswana and later as High Commissioner to Mozambique. In 2009, she returned to South Africa to work at the diplomatic training academy of the Department of International Relations and Cooperation. She also acquired various business interests in South Africa, and published two sets of memoirs, A Dream Fulfilled (about her broader career) and Two Nations, One Vision (about her time in Mozambique).

In April 2019, President Cyril Ramaphosa awarded her the Order of Luthuli in Silver for:

"Her excellent contribution to the fight for the liberation of the people of South Africa. She did outstanding work in raising awareness on repression in South Africa and mobilised support for those who were facing the apartheid security forces inside South Africa daily."
