= African Communist =

South African Communist Party magazine

- Categories: African politics
- Publisher: Inkululeko Publications
- Founded: 1959
- Country: South Africa
- Based in: Johannesburg
- Language: English
- Website: African Communist
- ISSN: 0001-9976 (print); 1560-7887 (web)

African Communist is the magazine of the South African Communist Party, published quarterly. The magazine was started by a group of Marxist-Leninists in 1959. It has its headquarters in Johannesburg.
