= Solomon Mahlangu Freedom College =

Location
- Mazimbu, Morogoro; Tanzania
- Coordinates: 06°51′10.85″S 37°39′26.85″E

Information
- Established: 1978
- Closed: 9 September 1992
- Principal: Alpheus Mangezi
- Grades: 1 - 12

The Solomon Mahlangu Freedom College (SOMAFCO), was an educational institution established by the exiled African National Congress (ANC) in 1978 at Mazimbu, Tanzania. It provided primary and secondary education to students who had fled South Africa after the 1976 Soweto uprising or who were the children of existing exiles. It taught both academic and vocational subjects, unlike the Bantu education system that hosted black students in South Africa. Farmlands supplied food to the institution and it also included a hospital. It was officially opened by Oliver Tambo in 1985.

== History ==
The ANC established its educational centre in Morogoro, Tanzania on land donated by the Tanzanian government during 1977, facilitated by Tanzanian Anna Abdallah. The land at Mazimbu consisted of some farm buildings on 600 acres. The school was named after Solomon Mahlangu, a member of the ANC's military wing, Umkhonto we Sizwe (MK) and an exile of the 1976 Soweto uprising. Other names that had been suggested for the school were the Albert Luthuli Institute (after Albert Luthuli) and the ANC Freedom School.

The complex was built by Oswald Dennis, an ANC civil engineer trained in East Germany. He was later supported by architect Spenser Hodgson. Work started in July 1977, built by Tanzanian labourers and supervised by the ANC, while education began under trees or in the existing farm buildings. Eventually around eighty per cent of the workforce comprised Tanzanians. As it was to be a boarding school, accommodation was required and so six units catering for 144 pupils were built, with eight students per room. The first dormitory was completed for occupation in late 1979 by pupils and teachers. By 1980, the land had been cleared, existing houses on the land renovated, a temporary water supply and sewage system in place and the buildings linked to the local electricity network. Future plans called for more dormitories, houses, kitchen and dining rooms as well as a library.

Initially the plan for the facility was for a secondary school for exiles of the 1976 Soweto uprising and children of the pre-1976, but soon a pre-primary school was established and by 1984 it would be formally called the Charlotte Maxeke Children's Centre. The centre started in the late 1970s as a crèche, first in the town itself before being moved back into a renovated house at SOMAFCO in 1981 as a crèche and nursery school. The centre opened in 1984, built by Oswald Dennis from money supplied by the Swedish Teachers' Union.

By 1985 a primary school was formally established. In 1980, New Zealanders Terry and Barbara Bell arrived in Tanzania to establish the primary school which operated out of one of the renovated houses though overcrowding meant some had to attend primary school in town. All teaching occurred in English. The Bells left in 1982 after clashing over the style of the school management. Dennis and Hazel September took over the management of the primary school and the style of teaching changed to a more conventional one of grade and performance measures.

Food for the facility was supplied from the farms' land which would supply milk, eggs, pork, beef and maize. Hans Jurgen's expertise as an agricultural consultant would provided by the Swedish International Development Cooperation Agency. He would set about constructing a farm plan to make the facility self-sufficient by 1984 for 2,500 residents. Teachers and students were expected spend a time each week working on the farms. Security for the complex was provided by the Tanzania People's Defence Force.

Medical issues were initially conducted by a clinic at the institution but when politics and personal issues took hold there in the early eighties and with the increase in the need to supply more sophisticated medical treatments, the ANC decided that a hospital should be built. Later called the ANC-Holland Solidarity Hospital, it was opened on 1 May 1984. A solidarity group in the Netherlands under Henk Odenk financed it and the ANC was responsible for its construction.

The furniture factory, financed out of Finland, opened in 1980 and was called the Vuyisile Mini Furniture Factory, named after Vuyisile Mini, an executed MK soldier. In addition to repairing broken furniture, it supplied the building projects with doors, window frames and furniture.

== Teaching and curriculum ==
Teachers were recruited from three main sources: from among ANC members with professional qualifications; from among matriculated members of the organisation; and from foreign volunteer teachers who supported the ANC's aims. The ANC wished to emphasise the teaching of the hard sciences, such as science and biology, subjects that were not regularly taught to black pupils in South Africa under the governments Bantu Education policy and which there was a shortage of among its own teachers. Teachers were eventually recruited from Europe – including from the United Kingdom, Nordic countries, the Netherlands and GDR – and later from Nigeria, Zambia and Tanzania.

The students were educated only in English, with both a traditional non-Bantu education and political education. By the late 1980s, subjects included english, maths, history, geography, chemistry, biology, physics, agricultural science, typing, integrated science, technical drawing, development of societies, literature, and history of the struggle. The latter three were examined internally, with the other subjects examined externally in the United Kingdom as GCE O level examinations. The secondary school consisted of six forms or grades and classes took place from Monday to Friday with a uniform worn though not strictly enforced. Corporal punishment though not officially allowed did occur from time to time and depended on the teacher concerned.

Tertiary education was not conducted by the college but through means of scholarships, worthy candidates received further education in British, European and American universities; Communist countries also assisted, but mainly in the spheres of agriculture, paramedicine, and engineering, as well as other technical skills.

== Chief Administrator / Director of schools ==
- 1982 - 1986 Mohammed Tikly
- 1987 - 1988 Tim Maseko
- 1989 - 1992 Alpheus Mangezi

== Secondary School Principals ==
- Oct 1978 Winston Njobe
- 1981 - 1985 Tim Maseko
- 1986 - 1990 Andrew Masondo
- 1990 - 1991 Don Mgakana
- 1991 - 1992 Ray Marutle

Vice-Principal - Slim Zindela

== Teachers and alumni ==
- Lionel Bernstein - teacher
- Ruth First - history curriculum
- John Pampallis - teacher
- Jack Simons - teacher
- Lindiwe Zulu - alumna
- Peter Knoope - teacher
- Aubrey Matlole - teacher
- Zandisile Pase - teacher
- Mzwandile Kibi - teacher

== Financial backers ==
The college received funding from foreign donors. Most Scandinavian donations to the ANC were spent on education, with Norway and Sweden contributing $12 million in 1985 and $25 million respectively by 1988. Swedish aid was provided by the Swedish International Developmental Cooperation Agency. Other donations for the work came from the German Democratic Republic, Soviet Union, United Nations Development Programme, World Health Organization (WHO) solidarity organisations, and individuals.

== Closure ==
On its closure on 9 September 1992, the educational complex consisted of a pre-primary, primary and secondary school, the farm, furniture factory and other support units. The infrastructure that remained behind was integrated into the Sokoine University of Agriculture. In 1991, the National Co-ordinating Committee on for the Return of Exiles set up the Batlagae Trust, who through the means of bursaries, integrated the school's pupils back into the South African education system on their return to the country.

The school's archives are held at the University of Fort Hare. The documents began to arrive in September 1992 and stored in Centre for Cultural Studies before being moved to the Howard Pim Library in 1995.
