= Bertha Mkhize =

South African teacher, tailor and activist (1889–1981)

- Portrait of Mkhize
- Born: Nhlumba Bertha Mkhize; 6 June 1889; Embo, Colony of Natal
- Died: 3 October 1981 (aged 92); Inanda, KwaZulu-Natal, South Africa
- Other names: Bertha Mkize
- Occupations: teacher, tailor and women's rights activist
- Years active: 1907–1975

Bertha Mkhize (6 June 1889 – 3 October 1981) was a South African teacher, who gained legal emancipation as a feme sole operating a business in her own right. As the government began implementing Apartheid in the late 1940s and early 1950s, she joined labor unions and women's organizations, leading demonstrations against the policies of the government. She was arrested twice for these activities and charged in the second incident with treason, but found not guilty of the allegations. When she was forced to give up her business, she became a pioneer in the Baháʼí Faith, embracing its doctrine of equality for all people. She worked to establish twenty-eight Baháʼí communities in KwaZulu-Natal.

== Early life ==
Nhlumba Bertha Mkhize was born on 6 June 1889 in Embo, near Umkomaas in the Colony of Natal to Mashobane Mkhize, an oxcart driver. Around the age of four, Mkhize's father died and the family relocated to Inanda, where she enrolled in the Inanda Seminary School. She was one of the first students of the all-girls school. After completion of her studies at the seminary, she went on to graduate from Ohlange High School.

== Career ==
In 1907, Mkhize began teaching at Inanda Seminary and remained there for the next four years. While she was teaching, she took tailoring classes to learn the skill. In 1909, she was legally emancipated. The process required her to appear before a magistrate with a signed document from her guardians granting her the right to conduct her affairs without her male family members' approval. This was an unusual procedure for Zulu women at the time and gave her the right to homestead or open her own business. In 1911, she left the teaching profession and moved to Durban where she went into tailoring with her brother. She continued with her interest in literacy, working in a children's center for twenty-five years. She also spoke out against oppressive measures used to undermine people's rights, like culling their cattle or forcing them and their owners to be plunged in pesticide under the guise of controlling typhus.

At its organization, Mkhize joined the African National Congress Women's League (ANCWL) and became involved in women's rights issues, participating in marches in 1931 and 1936 against requirements for women to have travel passes. She also joined the Industrial and Commercial Workers' Union, campaigning against curfews, low wages, and other working restrictions. In the early 1950s a series of restrictive laws were passed by the Apartheid legislature which required women to vacate urban areas within 72 hours or live with a man who had a permanent permit of residence. As early as 1950, protests of the new laws which curtailed free movement were held in urban areas throughout the country. Mkhize led the demonstrations in Durban in March 1950. In 1952, she joined around 500 other women to march on the Durban City Council. Known as the Defiance Campaign, at issue was a law that required women to obtain permission to travel. Mkhize spoke in favor of retracting the restriction, (Note: The source states that the Defiance Campaign happened in 1925, but this is clearly a typographical error as numerous other sources indicate the campaign originated in June, 1952.) and for her defiance spent several months in prison.

Because the women were successful in exerting pressure on the government, Mkhize and others recognized that further organization would further their cause. To that end, they created the Federation of South African Women (FEDSAW). She was one of the women who attended the founding conference in 1954 and was selected as one of the national vice presidents along with Florence Matomela, Lillian Ngoyi, and Gladys Smith. They drafted Women's Charter, which called for universal enfranchisement regardless of race, and equal opportunity in the areas of civil liberties, domestic rights, employment and pay. Two years later, Mkhize had become President of ANCWL, which held a mass demonstration in August 1956 to show the strength of women's opposition to a new implementation of women's pass laws. Along with other leaders of the women's movement, Mkhize was arrested for treason in the middle of the night in December 1956. The women, which included other activists like Frances Baard, Helen Joseph, Lillian Ngoyi, and Annie Silinga were accused of plotting to overthrow the government. The trial lasted for four and a half years, resulting in not guilty verdicts for all 156 women arrested on that night raid.

In 1958, Mkhize was introduced to the Baháʼí Faith and joined the organization on 1 January 1959. The message of unity for all people was in line with her own convictions and she became active in the church. She had continued running her business in Durban, but in 1965 the Durban City Council forced the closure of all African businesses and removed their owners of the area. She worked actively in Natal and Zululand for five years on behalf of the Baháʼí Faith and then settled in Gezinsila in Eshowe as a pioneer. Along with other Baháʼí teachers, Mkhize was responsible for founding twenty-eight congregations in the area. In 1968, she was elected to serve as a delegate to the National Spiritual Assembly of South and West Africa and served for one year. She translated many texts of the faith into Zulu. After nine years, her health began to fail in 1975, but she remained in her post until 1978, when she bequeathed her home to the faith and returned to Inanda.

== Death and legacy ==
Mkhize died on 3 October 1981 in Inanda and is remembered for her pioneering role in women's rights. A street in Durban was renamed in her honor in 2010. A life-sized sculpture of Mkhize created by Cristina Salvoldi was installed at the National Heritage Monument in Tshwane near Johannesburg in 2017.

== See also ==
- Baháʼí Faith in South Africa
