= Red Location (township) =

Township

Red Location, Ilali Ebomvu, is one of the oldest townships in South Africa. It is situated in the township of New Brighton in Nelson Mandela Bay, Eastern Cape. It is commonly described as 'the umbilical cord of New Brighton'. It has its characteristic red appearance due to the corrugated deep red structures of the settlement which date back to the early twentieth century. These corrugated iron structures were sourced from a de-constructed concentration camp established in Uitenhage during the South African War. The recycled structures were painted red and consequently the oldest section of New Brighton became known as the Red Location. The township was aimed at housing black people and started development in 1902. Many prominent political and cultural South African leaders were born or spent time in the township.

== Red Location ==
Red Location was the first official housing scheme in Port Elizabeth. It soon became overcrowded and 'White Location' was developed to relieve the population pressures in Red Location. White location became the first economic housing scheme built after the urban areas of 1923 in South Africa. Soon after, subsequent locations were built, namely Monamee, Boastville, Elundi, and kwaFord. This group of locations is collectively known as New Brighton township.

Benefits of housing schemes included physical space and privacy, financial security and social status. There were also no curfews in this location.

In South Africa the word location originally referred to Mfengu settlements on the colonial side of the Kei River after the frontier war of 1835–1836. It came to have a more general meaning of a place where black people live, though the term township became the more common term after the 1960s.

'Locations' were different from the towns and cities around them. The oldest location in New Brighton township, Red Location, was the only area in the location where alcohol consumption was allowed. Red Location became a hub of social gatherings and had an energising communal spirit. A culture which is unique to townships/locations was created. This culture gave rise to a sense of belonging. Red Location had high levels of criminal activity and was overcrowded. The criminal activities in the evenings rendered the area unsafe for many residents of Red Location. During the late 1940s a famous criminal 'Mabuli' killed many people in Jabavu Road, his time of power was described as 'the reign of terror'. After his death, young boys from Red Location used the name 'Mabuli' as protection against rival gangs and criminals. Another well known criminal from Red Location was 'Bra Sixteen' whose weapon of choice was a bicycle spoke like the character "Butcher" in Athol Fugard's novel Tsotsi (1980). Fugard put the New Brighton township on the literary map in the 1960s through multiple plays including 'Tsotsi' and 'The Coat'.

By the early 1940s, government officials knew that New Brighton township was an ANC stronghold. The ANC organised multiple acts of resistance in New Brighton against rent increases in 1945 and again in 1951. There was a bus boycott in 1949 and many in the locations of New Brighton participated in the Defiance Campaign in Port Elizabeth at the New Brighton Railway station in 1952.

== Housing ==
Housing in Red Location were categorised:

- CLASS A was a 2 bedroom house for the 'civilised native'
- CLASS B was a 1 bedroom house for 'ordinary native labourers' and
- CLASS C was dormitories for single men

Red location had no sewage system or electricity. A communal bucket system was used. Red Location had a distinguishably foul smell.

== Tuberculosis ==
Red Location was referred to as the TB Huis (TB House), with poor living conditions being a major factor for the pandemic in the area.

== Schooling ==
In the 1930s, Red Location had two schools, Lower Primary Upper United School (Grade 1–4), which was under the authority of the Order of Ethiopia Church, and Upper United (Grade 5-5), which was run by the Methodist Church. Most of the schools were on church premises and were multi-grade. They promoted Christian values and faith. This meant Christianity and education were largely intertwined in the locations. There were no high schools in Red Location. Mount Rod's Paterson High School was multiracial but mainly provided for Indian and Coloured students. Other options for high schools included the historic Eastern Cape Missionary School, Lovedale College, in Alice and Healdtown Methodist Missionaries School in Fort Beaufort, which were located outside Port Elizabeth. By 1948 the only black secondary school in Red Location was Newell High School in Jolobe Road.

== Early segregation ==
Segregation in the Cape Colony started in the 1770s to avoid conflict between the Xhosa people and the British settlers. In the 1800s residents of places such as Gubbs Location, Strangers Location, South End and Korsten were forcibly evicted from their homes. They were evicted due to fears of violence and social disorder that would follow the fast rate of immigration of black people to the towns and cities. Native locations were legitimised by colonial law in 1847. Red Location was developed in order to govern the natives and preserve European and Native national individuality through the Native Strategy.

== The Location Strategy ==
The Location Strategy was implemented in rural areas in the 1830s and later in 1840s in the urban areas of the Eastern Cape. Objectives of the location strategy included supervising tribunal institutions, maintaining order, tax collection as well as the provision of services like tribunals. It was believed that contamination of disease could be reduced through separating from the natives. Black people resisted the governments laws of segregation with the passing of the Native Reserve Location Act of 1903. This law was passed due to an increasing number of black people dwelling near white settlements. Black people who lived close to white people were evicted and moved to Red Location, New Brighton.

Below are a few recommendations that were made for such "locations" in South Africa:

- each location would be governed by a superintendent as well as an assistant appropriate to the size of the location,
- order would be maintained through police forces,
- each location would have a 'model mechanical school' where appropriate arts and skills would be taught,
- systemic agricultural instruction of each location would be given by the superintendent.

The Location strategy ensured that whites and blacks lived separately and that the 'ordinary white person' would almost never visit the locations.

== Locations pre-Red Location ==
During the 1800s the following black residential areas existed:

=== Strangers Location ===
Strangers Location is the oldest location in Port Elizabeth. It was established in 1855 and started through a land grant by the British government. In 1844, Strangers Location had approximately 1700 people residences. They lived in 177 cottages and 37 huts paying 30/- for rent. The people living in this location included the Mfengu people, the Xhosa, Basotho, Zulu and Khoi people. Strangers Location was commonly known as 'Fingo City' as the majority of the residences were initially the Mfengu people. The Mfengu people were the first to work as labourers in Port Elizabeth and after time, inter-mixing of cultures occurred between the Mfengu people and other residences in the location. Officials decided to destroy Strangers Location after a bubonic plague in October 1901.

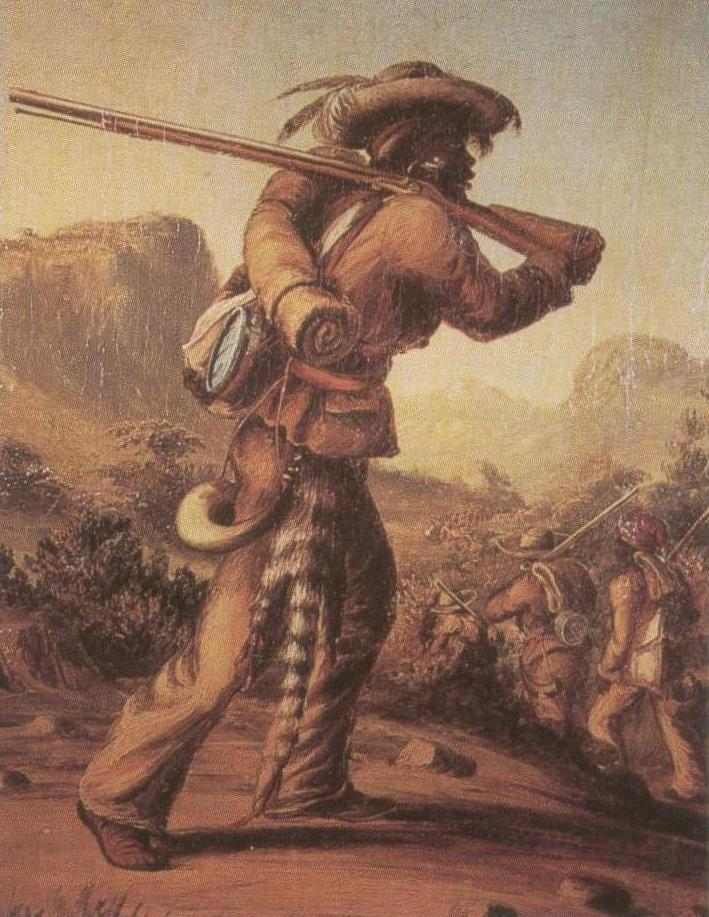
Mfengu Soldiers in the Cape Colony

=== Coopers Location ===
Coopers location was situated between the ravine and was built to handle the overcrowding in Strangers Location. It was established in 1877. It was the second municipal location and housed 450 people. Many people from Strangers and Coopers lived in the location for up to 15 years. 1500 of the residences attended church regularly and 250 children attended schooling in the locations. A large proportion of people from Coopers Location went to Strangers Location for religious and schooling purposes.

=== Gubbs Location ===
Initially Gubbs Location was land which was privately owned by Mr Gubbs. Black people spontaneously started to create dwelling places on his private property. With complaints from white people in the surroundings, the squatters were forcibly removed. Mr Gubbs then applied for permission from the council to allow black people to build their homes on his land, to which the council approved. Gubbs Location was established in 1860. The people of Gubbs Location resisted western influence by wearing their traditional attire and performing traditional practices. The occupants of Gubbs Location refused to live in western cottages and would build their own round huts. A total of 120 homes were built on Mr Gubbs' farm. An official town council was founded in 1885 for Gubbs Location. Soon after, dwellers of Gubbs Location were forced to leave for Red Location. They were given less than four days to evacuate.

Kloof, Gubbs and Coopers Locations were declared health hazards and the people were evicted. Many residences of these locations refused to move to Red Location after the passing of the Native Reserve Location Act of 1903. Many others moved to Korsten, which was a racially mixed area.

People resisted moving to Red Location due to:

- high rent and transport costs
- trading restrictions
- unstable housing and
- white employers complaining of long distances, causing workers to arrive late.

Some town councils compensated evicted people financially and many used this money to buy land in Korsten or lease land elsewhere.

=== Korsten ===
Korsten was a piece of land, originally owned by a man from Holland called Frederick Korsten. Korsten was located around 5 km away from New Brighton. The government had no control over Korsten as they had not created it. This area had no racial segregation. The demographics of the location included Blacks, Whites, Chinese, Malay and Coloureds. There was a huge influx of new residences at Korsten between 1901 and 1905. This area became a focus for political struggle in South Africa. In October 1901, 100 people lived in Korsten and by April 1903, 3000 people lived in Korsten. After the 1902 Act many did not want to move to Red Location even though the living conditions in Korsten were declared 'unfit for human habitation'. Black people did not receive compensation after being evicted from Korsten. Matyu, a resident who was evicted said, 'Furniture was broken and people and their goods, including dogs, were crammed into the back of military trucks'.

== Modern New Brighton Township ==
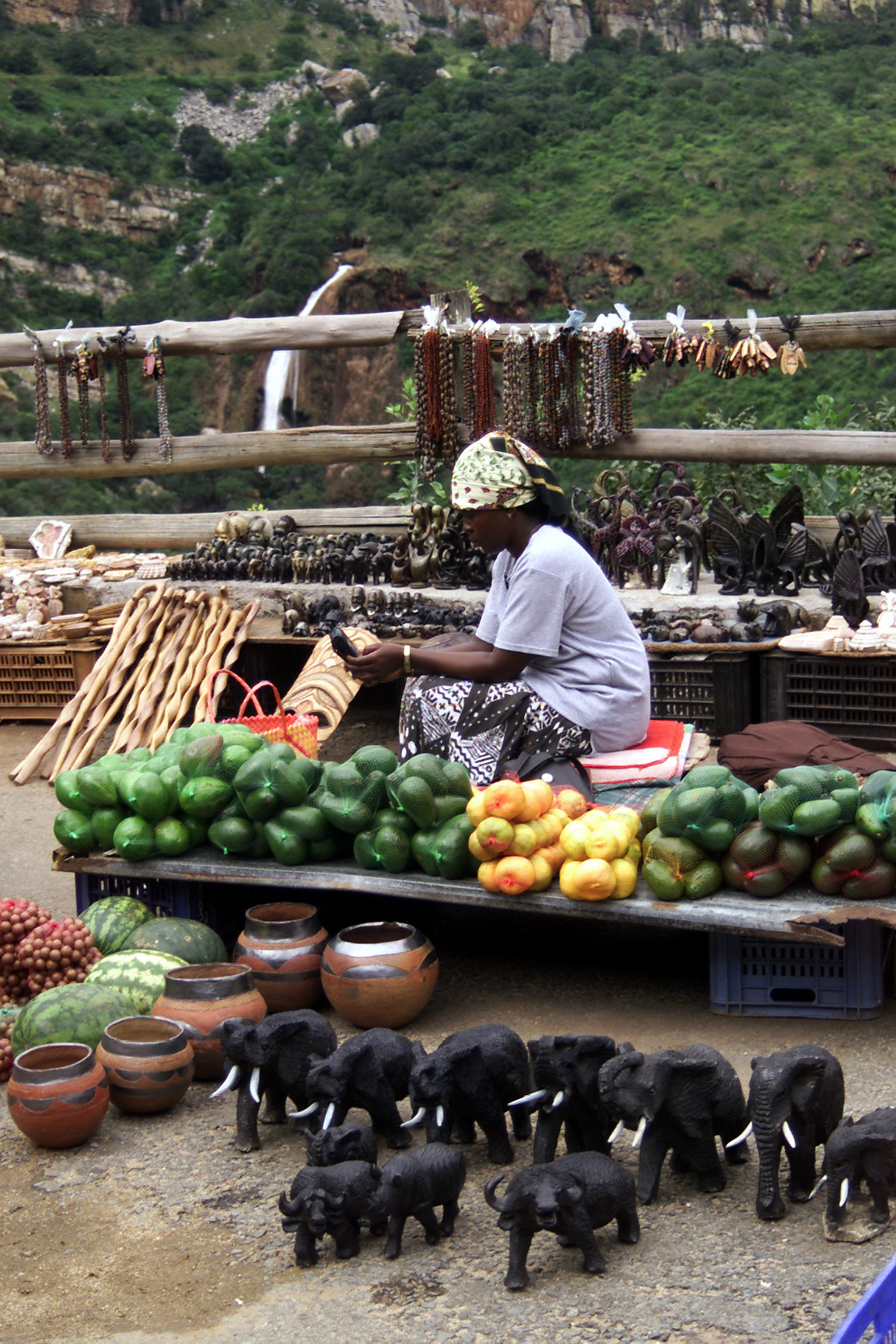
A typical street vendor commonly found selling in modern locations or townships

'New Brighton Township' includes Red Location, White Location, Monamee, Boastville, Elundi and kwaFord. The area has become a tourist attraction with township tours which show the social and political history of townships. There are informal street vendors who sell fresh fruit, clothing and African crafts. The tour guides allow visitors to interact with the new generation of the people of Red Location and surrounding townships. In June 1998 a project was launched to commemorate New Brighton as a site of struggle. The first phase of the project entailed the erection of a Freedom Struggle Museum and the reconstruction of corrugated iron houses in the Red Location. The project would create a cultural complex with an art gallery, a creative art centre, a market, a library, a hall room, conference centre and visitors' accommodation. Red Location Museum, designed by Noero Wolff Architects in 2005 is located in New Brighton township. It is the first of five buildings that make up the Red Location Cultural Precinct in the township of New Brighton. It was designed to monument the Apartheid struggle in the township and has won 3 international awards. Red Location Museum was closed in 2013 due to community protests related to housing.

== Notable people in Red Location ==
- Dr Njongwa Born in Qumbu 1919, James L. Zwelinzima N Jongwe became the first black medical doctor to graduate in South Africa. He established a practice in Red Location and stood for ANC president in 1952. He lost the campaign to Chief Albert Luthuli
- Florence Matomela, - A prominent volunteer during the Defiance Campaign
- Nosipho Dastile, a well known political figure and founder of the United Democratic Front. She was the first president of the Uitenhage Women's Organisation and chair of the ANC Women's League in Uitenhage, after the unbanning of liberation movements in the 1990s.
- Milase Majola - A community worker and winner of a bursary to study at the Girl Guides movement in England.
- Nontuthuzelo Mabala, who marched against the pass laws in 1956. She was jailed at the age of 24 for six years for the role she played in the struggle against Apartheid.
- Lilian Diedricks, born 1925 near the railway line in Red Location. She was an active shop steward and founding member of the Federation of South African Women in 1954. Her family was forced out of New Brighton during the 1940s. She was also one of the four women who led the Women's March on the Union buildings to oppose the pass laws in 1956.
- Veronica Sobukwe, spouse of Robert Sobukwe, played an integral role in the Defiance Campaign. Her family was constantly harassed by the police.

== See also ==
- New Brighton, Eastern Cape
- Mfengu
- Kei River
- Defiance Campaign
- Apartheid
- Red Location Museum
- Apartheid
