= Florence Matomela =

South African activist (1910–1969)

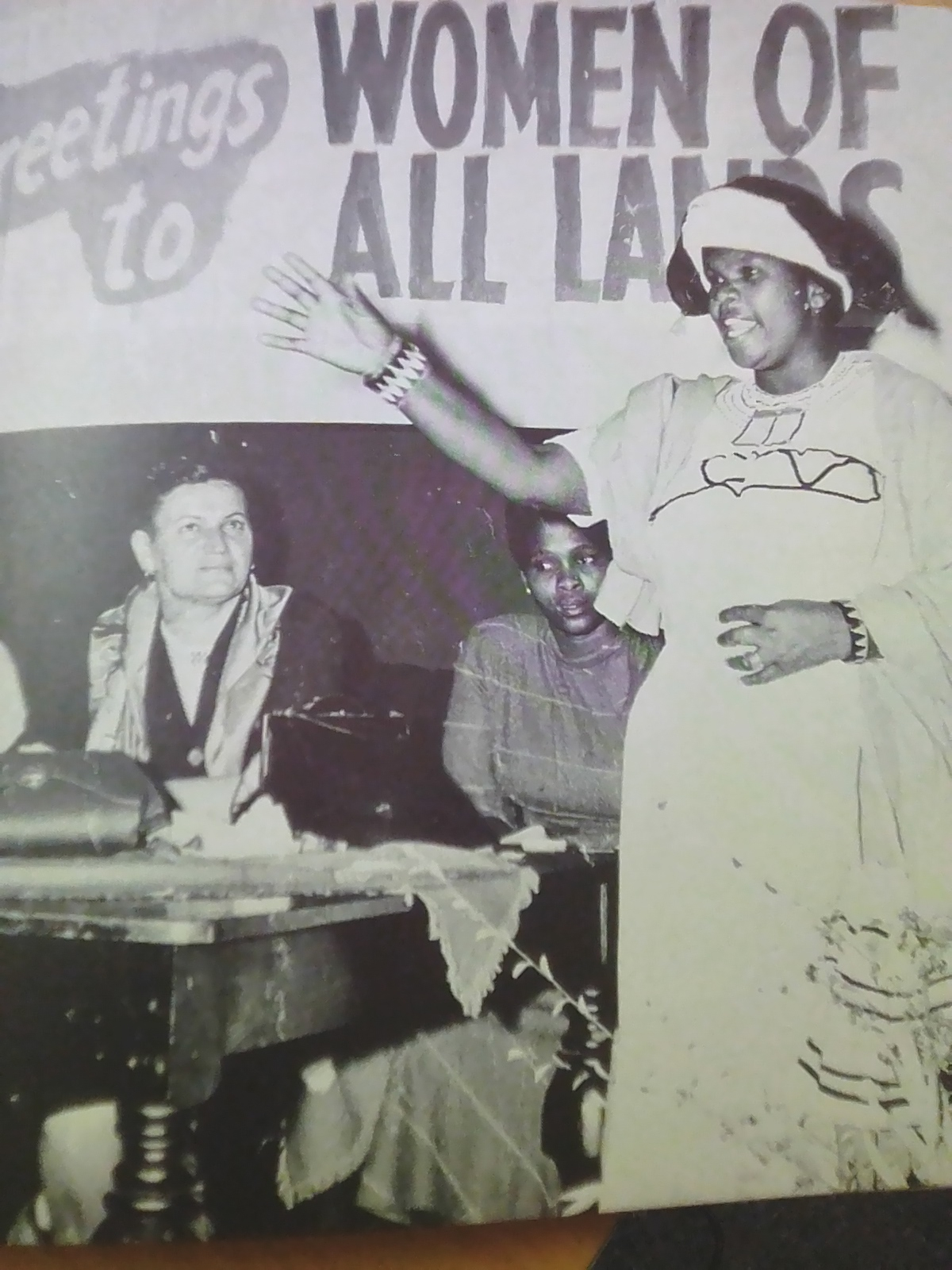

Florence Matomela OLG (1910–1969) was a South African anti-pass law activist, communist, civil rights campaigner, ANC veteran, teacher and mother who dedicated her life to fighting against Apartheid laws in South Africa. Matomela was the provincial organiser of the African National Congress Women's League (ANCWL) and vice-president of the Federation of South African Women (FEDSAW) in the mid 1950s.

== Early life ==
Florence Matomela was born in 1910. She raised five children while working as a teacher in rural Eastern Cape. She also spent time in New Brighton township.

== Rural activism ==
The activism of women like Matomela, in rural areas, was often neglected however, women in the Herschel and Qumbu district of the Eastern Cape played a very important role in activism. Due to the growing number of male migration away from rural Eastern Cape, many women were left without enough resources to sustain themselves and their children. The women sold their surplus produce such as sorghum, maize and wheat to traders to try and purchase their basic needs. The women were mostly dissatisfied with the treatment that they received from these traders as, there was little regulation of trade in these agricultural communities. These conditions led to a total boycott of trading stores in 1922 led by community members like Mrs Annie Sodyiyo. The arrest of women from the community increased their solidarity and ultimately, traders agreed to regulate prices. Matomela was exposed to female activists and rural political activity from a young age. These environments contributed into creating Florence Matomela into the influential politician that she became.

== Political career ==
Florence Matomela was one of the first women to volunteer in the 1952 Defiance Campaign. The more strict influx control measures and pass laws under the Native Laws Amendment Act implemented in 1952 made it an offence for any African to be in an urban area for longer than 72 hours without the necessary documentation. The only women who were permitted to live in townships were the wives and unmarried daughters of men with permits. For the first time, women were required to carry reference books. The reference book held the holders identity, employment, place of legal residence, tax payments and if applicable permission to be in urban areas. Many women were against this as it would take away their freedom of movement. Protests started when news of the new legislation were leaked to the press. After influx control regulations were implemented in Port Elizabeth. Florence Matomela spearheaded a demonstration which resulted into the burning of passbooks. Making this one of the first acts of the Defiance Campaign in the Eastern Cape.

Florence Matomela, along with Frances Baard, Hilda Tshaka, Talita Chaba and Christina Jasson played a major role in organising the Defiance Campaign in New Brighton, Port Elizabeth. They held numerous mass meetings. There were police informants who attended these meetings and they reported that Matomela was one of the most effective and militant speakers in New Brighton. Florence Matomela often appealed to women and other volunteers to join the African National Congress, ANC, and drew in many members as the leading figure of the ANC at the time. On the 26 of June 1952 she and other activists held a mass meeting at the civic center in New Brighton. They left the civic center in the early hours of the morning for a demonstration. They planned to enter the "Europeans only" section of New Brighton Railway Station. Police sergeants were awaiting them by 5 o'clock that morning. Florence Matomela and another 34 activists were arrested in Port Elizabeth due to their participation in the Defiance Campaign. Due to her involvement in the campaign, she spent six weeks in prison on a charge for civil disobedience. She was later tried again with leaders of the Cape and given a nine-month suspended sentence. Matomela was the provincial organiser of the African National Congress Women's League (ANCWL) and vice-president of the Federation of South African Women (FEDSAW) in the mid 1950s. When Florence Matomela was the president of the Eastern Cape branch of the ANCWL, she met with Frances Baard, who was a leader in the Food and Canning Workers Union (FCWU), and Ray Alexander, who was the general secretary of the FCWU in Port Elizabeth. Together they called a meeting to discuss the possibilities of creating a national women's organisation. There is no formal record of the meeting, however Ray Alexander said that about 40 women attended. FEDSAW was launched on the 17 April 1954. She helped organise the 1956 Women's March to the Union Buildings. She was one of the 156 charged for the Treason trial however, her charges were later dropped.

She was prohibited from being in Port Elizabeth in 1962. She was given a five-year sentence for furthering the aims of the banned ANC. Due to poor health provision in prison her health deteriorated, she was sometimes deprived of her insulin injections as a person suffering from diabetes. She was released from prison in 1968 to news that her husband had died three years prior without her notification. Matomela was banned yet again and died under the banning orders in 1969 at the age of 59.

== Honours ==
The ANC regional offices in Port Elizabeth, Eastern Cape are named Florence Matomela House. The artist Nombulelo Dassie created a sculpture of Florence Matomela. A year long exhibition curated by Nomabaso Bedeshe was held at Red Location Museum honouring Florence Matomela, Nontuthuzelo Mabala, Veronica Sobukwe, Lilian Diedricks and Nosipho Dastile. The exhibition included the biographies and photographs of the five women.

== See also ==
- Beer Hall Boycott
- Lillian Ngoyi
