= Annie Silinga =

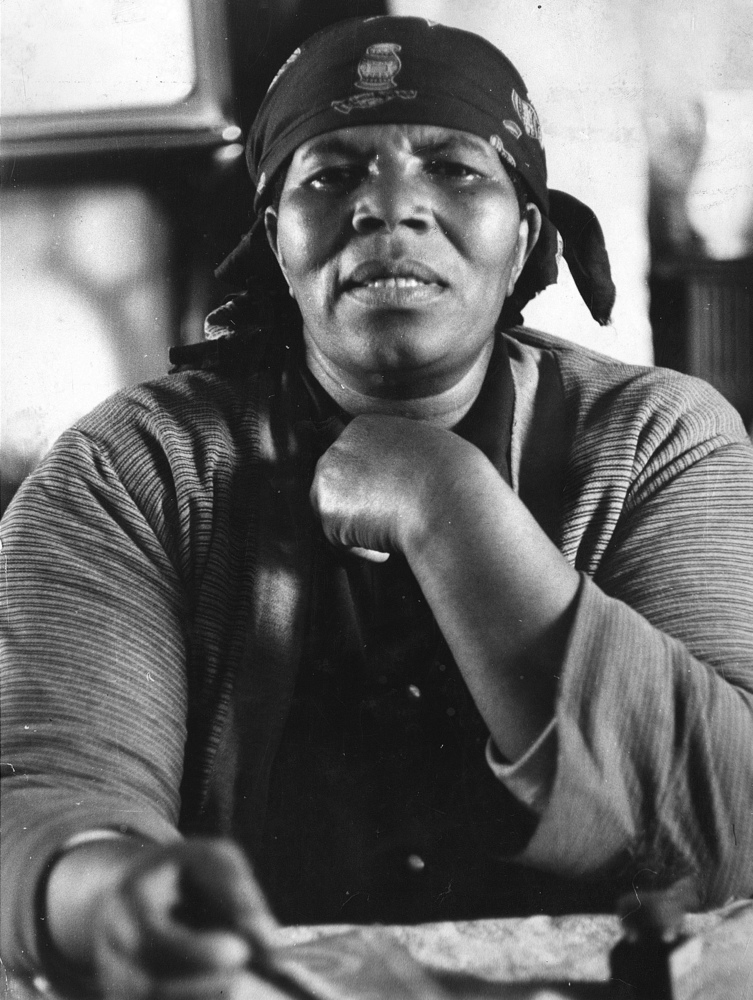
- Born: 1910; Nqqamakwe, Butterworth district, Transkei
- Died: 1984 (aged 73–74); Langa, Cape Town
- Occupations: anti-pass laws and anti-apartheid political activist

Annie Silinga OLG (1910-1984) was a South African anti-pass laws and anti-apartheid political activist. She is known for her role as the Cape Town African National Congress Women's League President, a leader in the 1956 anti-pass Women's March to the Union Buildings in Pretoria, South Africa and the only African woman in the 1956 treason trial in South Africa.

== Personal life ==
Annie Silinga was born in 1910 at Nqqamakwe in the Butterworth district of the Transkei, now known as the Eastern Cape, where she only completed a few years of primary school, leading to near illiteracy for most of her life afterward. For 27 Years, she lived in her native region and worked in the mines. Silinga grew up in Transkei during a time of prosperity, when the land allowed farming and cattle could graze freely. However, over population led to soil erosion and overgrazing causing poverty in the area. By 1937, conditions had deteriorated to the point where Silinga was desperate to move. Her "babies," she said, "had been dying in the Transkei." In 1937, when she was 27, Silinga moved to Cape Town where her husband Matthew had just gained employment, hoping for better medical facilities. In Cape Town, for the first time, Silinga, her husband and their five children could live together as a family. At his previous job in the mines of Johannesburg, accommodation was not provided for the families of the mineworkers and regulations forbade women from staying there for extended periods. After World War II, Silinga and her husband moved to Langa township. Although Silinga was arrested numerous times, she and her family remained in Langa where she died in 1984.

== Political work ==
After moving to Langa, after World War II, Silinga began attending meetings at which measures to improve conditions for the community were discussed. In 1948, aged 38, she joined the Langa Vigilance Association (LVA). LVA sought to fight for the improvement of living conditions in Langa and protect the residents from apartheid laws. In 1952, she joined the African National Congress (ANC) and soon after joining the ANC, she along with the other members would organize for over 6 months a campaign of civil disobedience against the National Party Government of South Africa. She took part in the anti-pass laws in the movement's 1952 Defiance Campaign where she was arrested and served a brief jail term for civil disobedience. She served the jail sentence with her six month old baby.

In 1953, Silinga, then a member of the ANC Women's League (ANCWL), was part of the core group that organised the first meeting of the Federation of South African Women (FSAW), to harness the outrage of women against the pass law issue. The group was led by Ray Alexander, communist and trade unionist, and included Gladys Smith of the Cape Housewives' League, Katie White of the Women's Food Committee, and Dora Tamanda of the ANCWL and the Communist Party of South Africa. At the first conference, held in Johannesburg in April 1954, She was elected as part of the FEDSAW National Executive Committee and was also at this meeting that the Women’s Charter was written by women from different races. In 1954, during a FEDSAW meeting at the Cape Town Parade, Silinga declared: “I will never carry a pass, I will only carry one similar to Mrs (Susan) Strijdom’s. She is a woman and I am too. There is no difference.” After breaking the pass law and a few unsuccessful appeals, she was banished to Transkei in 1956 under police escort. She returned illegally to be with her children and husband in Langa. In 1957, Silinga appealed her case successfully on the grounds that more than 15 years’ residence in Cape Town entitled her to remain there.

Silinga was one of the leaders of the 9 August 1956 Women’s March organised by FEDSAW to the prime minister's office in Pretoria to protest the issuing of passes. Silinga was arrested alongside other FEDSAW leaders Lilian Ngoyi and Helen Joseph, as well as ANC leaders Oliver Tambo and Nelson Mandela. The apartheid government charged Silinga, as well as 156 of the other leaders and activists, with high treason. Among those arrested, she was the only African Woman from the Western Cape to be arrested. The initial phase of the Treason Trial lasted until December 1957, when the state dropped charges against 61 of the defendants. Silinga was one of those released. In 1958, Silinga was elected as the president of the Cape Town ANCWL in 1958. In 1960 anti-pass law riots happened in Langa and Sharpeville. The apartheid government declared a state of emergency and Silinga was one of the people arrested. The ANC was banned as a political organisation in 1960. Upon her return from prison, she was involved in the formation of the Women’s Front, and was made a patron of the United Democratic Front in 1983. Silinga lived in Langa all her life and died without having carried a pass in 1984. Although she was buried in an unmarked pauper's grave, artist Sue Williamson, at the request of Annie Silinga’s family, created a piece to place at her grave in Langa cemetery. It bears Silinga's battle cry: "I will never carry a pass!"

== Legacy ==
Silinga is remembered as one of the leaders in the anti-pass campaign during apartheid South Africa. Besides political work, Silinga is remembered for her selfless character, having started a creche along Winnie Seqwana in Langa Township. Artist Tina Ramos Ekongo included her in her collection celebrating the legacy of other Anti-Apartaid leaders with her own portrait. She describes her as follows: “She was one of the leaders in the anti-pass campaign in apartheid South Africa who fought for better living conditions for her family and her country. Her kindness and caring nature stood out as important characteristics, often overlooked as political qualities. That she achieved this with only a few years of primary education is all the more remarkable.” A street in Phillipi, Cape Town is named after Annie Silinga.

== See also ==
- Defiance Campaign
- Women's March (South Africa)
