= Lilian Diedericks =

South African activist (1925–2021)

Lilian Diederick
- Born: 17 December 1925
- Died: 21 December 2021 (aged 96)
- Citizenship: South Africa

Lilian Diedericks OLS (17 December 1925, in Port Elizabeth, Red Location – 21 December 2021 in Port Elizabeth) was a South African activist known as a founding member of the Federation of South African Women.

== Early life ==
Lilian Diederick was born in New Brighton township, in Port Elizabeth, Eastern Cape, South Africa before the time of apartheid. Her family was considered "coloured" and because of that, they were forcefully moved out of their home when that zone was established as "Black only". Even though she didn't finish school and only had a formal 5th grade education, she was multilingual; speaking fluent in English, Afrikaans, and isiXhosa. This would later help her drastically in reaching many people through her activism. Her ability to speak multiple languages helped unite many people across multiple races and backgrounds.

== Activism in Politics ==
Lilian Diederick became politically active in the 1950's. Gqeberha, formerly known as Port Elizabeth, was an active place for underground political work in the 1940s and 1950s. This may have resulted in inspiring Diedericks' political consciousness, leading her to participate in the liberation struggle. Diedericks was an active trade unionist, leader of South African Congress of Trade Unions and South African Communist Party member. She was also an active shop steward and was involved in the labor movement with the Food and Canning Workers Union. This union was a militant group that fought for and brought about major improvements to workers wages, working, and living conditions.

Diedericks co-founded the Federation of South African Women in 1954 along with . She was one of the four women who led the Women's March on the Union buildings to oppose the pass laws in 1956 along with struggle icons Rahima Moosa, Helen Joseph, Lilian Ngoyi and Sophia De Bruyn. The pass laws were essential laws that forced Black men to carry reference papers in order for them to "pass" or walk around. The march started on August 9th, 1956 and this date marks a turning point politics in South Africa for women.

The Federation of South African Women (FEDSAW) played a crucial role in highlighting the role that women could play in the fight against Apartheid. This was important as before then women were generally not considered to be of much importance in the struggle, often viewed through traditional gender norms. This included submitting a document named 'What Women Demand' which included calls such as adequate education and housing, fair distribution of land and equal pay for equal work. In addition to supporting the fight against apartheid, Diedericks would often assist the families and children of those who were involved in the struggle, looking after them and providing necessities. For instance, when Raymond Mhlaba was imprisoned in 1964, Diedericks assisted in taking care of his son.

== Arrest and Banishment ==
After a protest and march against the mayor of Port Elizabeth in 1956, Diedericks was arrested for treason, along with Frances Baard and Florence Matomela. She wasn't going to participate initially due to her having to young kids at the time, but after asked to do so by Matomela, she got involved in the march. Later on, her sister was assassinated because she was mistaken for Lilian by the "special branch" of the police.

Diedericks, Baard, and Matomela were imprisoned at the Fort in Johannesburg and acquitted in 1961. Diedericks was banned by the apartheid government, from 1963 to 1968.

The municipal house Brister House in Port Elizabeth was renamed the Lilian Diedericks Building in 2009. Lilian Diedericks lived in Gelvandale, Port Elizabeth.

== Honours ==
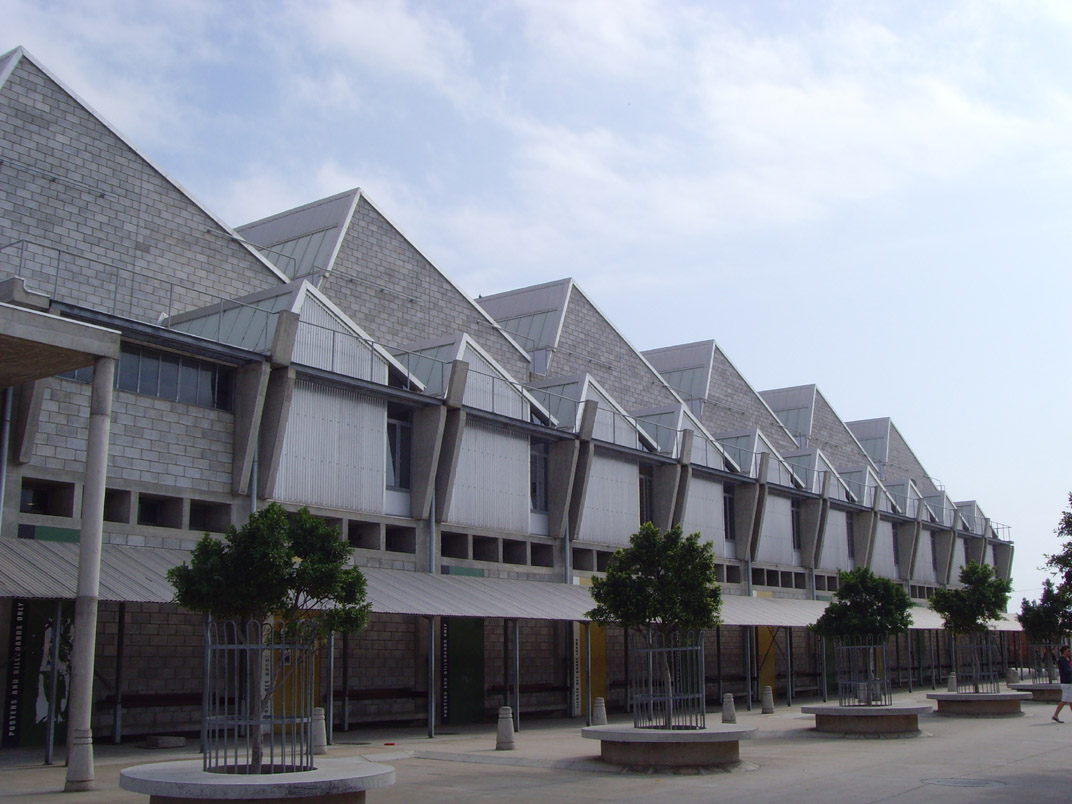
Red Location Museum in South Africa

The Red Location Museum in New Brighton held a year-long exhibition dedicated to these women of the liberation struggle, by paying tribute to Florence Matomela, Nontuthuzelo Mabala, Veronica Sobukwe, Lilian Diedricks and Nosipho Dastile.

On Women's Day in 2017, South African president at the time, Jacob Zuma announced plans in government of the creation of a statue of Diedericks that would honour her role in the fight against apartheid in South Africa, and her importance in helping women.

On 28 April 2018, Diedricks was honored by the National Orders of Pretoria for her activism.She was specifically awarded the Order of Luthuli by President Cyril Ramaphosa, which is the highest honor that can be awarded to an individual.

In the heart of Gqeberha, there is the Lilian Diedericks Municipal building which is named after her.

== Legacy ==
As one of the few surviving heroines of the Women's March (South Africa), Diedericks continued to fight for women's rights and a gender-equal society in South Africa, while she was in her 90s. Historians such as Janet Cherry claim her political impact and leadership in the 1950s is unmatched in today' political landscape.

She died on 21 December 2021 in her house in Port Elizabeth.
