= Christina Jasson =

- Born: 1928; South Africa
- Died: 1999 (aged 70–71)
- Citizenship: South African
- Occupations: Trade unionist, clerk
- Known for: Anti-apartheid activism, labour organizing

Christina 'Chrissie' Jasson (born 1928) was a South African clerk and trade unionist from Port Elizabeth, who stood accused of treason at the Rivonia Trial.

== Early life ==
Christina Jasson was born in 1928. She worked as a clerk in Port Elizabeth. Early life edit Christina Jasson was born in 1928. She worked as a clerk in Port Elizabeth.

== Political activism ==
Her political activism involved leading several strikes and she was active in the trade union movement where she organised food, canning workers and textile workers. She worked alongside Leslie Massina, Raymond Mhlaba, Wilton Mkwayi, Vuyisile Mini and Frances Baard.

She worked as the acting secretary of the Eastern Cape Action Committee between 1954 and 1955. Jasson was elected onto the national executive committee of the Federation of South African Women at the founding conference held in the Trade Hall in Johannesburg, on April 17, 1954. She participated in the 1955 founding conference of the South African Congress of Trade Unions (SACTU) representing the Textile Workers Industrial Union. She was an executive committee member of the SACTU National Conference in 1956. She was pregnant when she was accused of treason and stood trial at the Rivonia Trial. She was amongst the second string of co-conspirators. The 156 accused were arrested and taken to the Johannesburg prison, known as 'the Fort', where males and females were separated. Little is known of the conditions that the women faced during their time in prison. Her daughter was born during the trial proceedings. The charges of treason were dropped. She died in 1999.

== See also ==
- Defiance Campaign
