= Annie Peters =

South African anti-apartheid activist (1920–2007)

Annie Clorence Peters (1920–2007) was a South African anti-apartheid political activist. She was at the forefront of organising women from the Free State to the Anti-Pass march of 1956.

== Early life ==
Annie Clorence Peters also known as "Ouma Annie", was born in 1920 in Heidedal near Bloemfontein. Her mother was born from a relationship between a Scottish man and the daughter of a Basotho chief. Her mother was classified as coloured but was allowed to travel in whites-only areas due to her fair appearance, while Annie had to travel separately in the trams restricted for black people. She attended school in Heidedal as well as Lesotho.

== Political activity ==
Her political activity started during her schooling when she protested against the Bantu Education System. At the age of 16, she left school and moved with her mother to Sophiatown. In Sophiatown Annie worked as a tap-dancer while participating in defiance against apartheid legislation. Her political activity was particularly against the passbook derogatorily known as the dompas. She said: "I refused to get a passbook. I was also a human being, even though I was black."

Annie Peters was one of the 20 000 women who participated in the Anti-Pass march to the Union Buildings in 1956. She helped mobilise women from the then Orange Free State to take part in the historic anti-pass law protest. At the Union Buildings, she and fellow protesters, tore their passbooks. After forced evictions in Sophiatown, Annie moved to Meadowlands. She later returned to Bloemfontein working at Oranje Mental Hospital. She continued to advocate for racial freedom for all throughout her lifetime. She died in 2007 at the age of 87. Her grandchildren are still living in the township that is located to the southeast of Bloemfontein and was during apartheid reserved for coloureds. The two-roomed house is small, old and rundown. Annie Peters also lived in this home. She was honoured by the Free State government alongside Catherine "Katrine" Louw for their participation in organising the 1956 Women’s March. Mlamleli, the deputy chairperson provincial ANC Women’s League (ANCWL) announced that they would be building homes for the grandchildren of Annie Clorence Peters and Catherine "Katrine" Louw to pay homage to them.

== See also ==
- Apartheid
- Lillian Ngoyi
- Defiance Campaign
- Women's March (South Africa)
