= Sobukwe =

Sobukwe is a surname. Notable people with the surname include:

- Robert Sobukwe (1924–1978), South African anti-apartheid activist
- Veronica Sobukwe (1927–2018), South African nurse and anti-apartheid activist
