= Jabulani Chen Pereira =

- Born: Port Elizabeth, South Africa
- Education: Master of Arts, New York University
- Employer: Iranti
- Known for: LGBT Activism & Art

Jabulani Chen Pereira is a queer South African activist and visual artist.

== Education ==
Pereira holds a Master of Arts degree in Museum Studies from New York University focusing on museums and photography. Their thesis was titled Museum Exhibitions, Mass Violence and Human Rights.

== Activism ==
In 2011, while working as the Africa program coordinator for The International Gay & Lesbian Human Rights Commission, Pereira made a statement about LGBT rights in Nigeria:

We urge the President of Nigeria to lead his government in a manner that clearly abides with the African Charter of Human and Peoples' and the International Covenant on Civil and Political Rights. The impact of the decision by the Nigerian Senate to pass this Bill, known as the Same Sex Marriage ( Prohibition ) Bill, 2011 has placed gays, lesbians, gender-variant and gender non-conforming citizens in great fear for their safety and well-being.

In January 2012, Pereira founded Iranti, a non-governmental organisation focusing on queer rights issues primarily through visual media.

== Personal life ==
Pereira uses he/him/they pronouns.

== Exhibitions ==
- Critically Queer - discussed by Dr. Kylie Thomas in her book chapter The Transgressive Visions of Jabulani Chen Pereira.
- Reflections on the Truth and Reconciliation Commission, Red Location Museum, Port Elizabeth
- 100 Years of Women in Law, travelling exhibition.
