= Rita Ndzanga =

South African activist (1933–2022)

- Born: Rita Alice More; 17 October 1933; Ventersdorp
- Died: 17 August 2022 (aged 88)
- Education: standard 8
- Occupation: trade union organiser
- Known for: South African anti-apartheid activist
- Political party: African National Congress
- Spouse: Lawrence Ndzanga

Rita Alice Ndzanga (née More, 17 October 1933 – 17 August 2022) was a South African anti-apartheid activist and trade unionist. She was required to report weekly to the police and they would pay informants to report on her activities. Both she and her husband were imprisoned where he died. She later became a member of parliament and she was awarded the Order of Luthuli in 2004.

== Biography ==
Ndzanga was born on 17 October 1933 in Mogopa village, near Ventersdorp. Her family moved back and forth between Sophiatown and Mogopa during her childhood. Ndzanga did not finish high school, only reaching Form Three (Standard Eight).

Her first job was working with the Brick and Tile Workers Union. In 1955, she began working as the secretary for the Railway Workers Union. Ndzanga married Lawrence Ndzanga in 1956. Soon after, she became the secretary of the South African Congress of Trade Unions (SACTU). Ndzanga took part in the Women's March in 1956.

Ndzanga was banned from working with trade unions in 1964. Both she and her husband were detained under Section 6 of the Terrorism Act on 12 May 1969. She was imprisoned with Winnie Mandela, Thoka Mngoma, Martha Dlamini and Joyce Sikhakane. Ndzanga had four small children she had to leave behind. She was also tortured in prison. The police took shifts in order to interrogate her throughout the day. Walter Sisulu was able to send "a letter of encouragement" to Ndzanga while she was in prison.

In November 1976, she and her husband were detained again and in December, he was charged again under the Terrorism Act. In January 1977, he was reported to have had a heart attack while in prison, and Ndzanga, who was also detained, was not allowed to attend his funeral. She was released the day after his funeral.

Ndzanga became involved with the Federation of Transvaal Women (FEDTRAW) in 1984, where she was considered an "active patron." In 1999, she served as a member of Parliament and she continued for three terms.

A film based on Ndzanga's life, Rita Ndzanga - South African, came out in 1984. On 18 June 2004, South Africa awarded Ndzanga with the Order of Luthuli while she was still a member of parliament. Ndzanga has remained active. She described her time as a detainee during apartheid on 2011 as part of Governance Week.

Ndzanga died on 17 August 2022, at the age of 88. The government mourned her death.

== See also ==
- List of people subject to banning orders under apartheid
