= Baháʼí Faith in South Africa =

The Baháʼí Faith in South Africa began with the holding of Baháʼí meetings in the country in 1911. A small population of Baháʼís remained until 1950 when large numbers of international Baháʼí pioneers settled in South Africa. In 1956, after members of various tribes in South Africa became Baháʼís, a regional Baháʼí Assembly which included South Africa was elected. Later each of the constituent countries successively formed their own independent Baháʼí National Spiritual Assembly. Then in 1995, after a prolonged period of growth and oppression during Apartheid and the homelands reuniting with South Africa, the Baháʼí National Spiritual Assembly of South Africa was formed. In 2005 Baháʼís were estimated at 240,100 adherents.

== Early history ==
1911 marks the beginning of a presence of the Baháʼí Faith in South Africa at the home of Agnes Cook in Sea Point, Cape Town. Mr. and Mrs. William Fraetas from Muizenberg who had met ʻAbdu'l-Bahá, the son of the founder of the Baháʼí Faith, Baháʼu'lláh, in New York, in 1912 came back to South Africa.

=== ʻAbdu'l-Bahá's Tablets of the Divine Plan ===
ʻAbdu'l-Bahá wrote a series of letters, or tablets, to the followers of the religion in the United States in 1916–1917; these letters were compiled together in the book Tablets of the Divine Plan. The eighth and twelfth of the tablets mentioned Africa and were written on 19 April 1916 and 15 February 1917, respectively. Publication however was delayed in the United States until 1919—after the end of the First World War and the Spanish flu. The tablets were translated and presented by Mirza Ahmad Sohrab on 4 April 1919, and published in Star of the West magazine on 12 December 1919. ʻAbdu'l-Bahá mentions Baháʼís traveling "...especially from America to Europe, Africa, Asia and Australia, and travel through Japan and China. Likewise, from Germany teachers and believers may travel to the continents of America, Africa, Japan and China; in brief, they may travel through all the continents and islands of the globe" and " ...the anthem of the oneness of the world of humanity may confer a new life upon all the children of men, and the tabernacle of universal peace be pitched on the apex of America; thus Europe and Africa may become vivified with the breaths of the Holy Spirit, this world may become another world, the body politic may attain to a new exhilaration...."

After the death of ʻAbdu'l-Bahá Baháʼís began to move to South Africa. By 1929 there were 6 small groups of Baháʼís mainly due to pioneers and travelling Baháʼís, notably Martha Root, in the Western Cape and near Johannesburg. The very first local Baháʼí Assembly formed in Pretoria in 1925 but was dissolved in 1931, and by about 1937 only one Baháʼí remained from that period, Mrs. Agnes Carey. Carey was a social worker for women prisoners who had been released from the Pretoria prison, and because of her staunchness in the religion she was later honoured with the title of "The Mother of the Baháʼís of South Africa" by Shoghi Effendi, who was appointed the leader of the religion after ʻAbdu'l-Bahá's death. Shoghi Effendi had travelled through South Africa in 1929 and 1940. In 1949 the painter Reginald Turvey returned to South Africa from England as a Baháʼí since 1936 through his association with the well-known painter Mark Tobey and lifelong friend Bernard Leach. Turvey was unaware of the existence of other Baháʼís in South Africa including Agnes Carey. As a result, Turvey spent thirteen years believing he was the sole Baháʼí in South Africa. For his patience, devotion and subsequent services to the African Baháʼís in his latter years, he was given the title of "The Father of the Baháʼís of South Africa".

== Ten-Year Crusade ==
In 1953 Shoghi Effendi planned an international teaching plan termed the Ten Year Crusade. During the plan 65 pioneers from the United States, Canada, Germany, New Zealand and England settled in South Africa. Many of the pioneers settled permanently in the country; William Sears and his family, Harry and Margaret Ford, and Robert Miller and his family settled in Johannesburg; Ruth and Bishop Brown, who were Margaret Ford's mother and stepfather, settled in Durban. Lowell and Edith Johnson settled in Cape Town while Eleanor and Lyall Hadden settled in Pretoria.

In 1954 in Pretoria, Klaas Mtsweni, a Zulu, became the first indigenous South African to become a Baháʼí. In the succeeding years members of other South African ethnic groups including the Tswana, the Xhosa, the southern and Northern Sotho peoples, the Coloured ethnic group, the Cape Coloureds, the Cape Malays, and White, Afrikaners became Baháʼís. In 1959, after years of political involvement in ANC related organizations in the 1950s, Bertha Mkize became a Baháʼí and withdrew from political involvements and instead pioneered to KwaZulu where she helped found 28 Baháʼí communities.

In April 1956 the Baháʼí Faith was present in small numbers across 15 countries of Southern Africa including islands off Southern Africa. To administer these Baháʼí communities a regional governing body was elected in South Africa to cover them. Following the death of Shoghi Effendi and the election of the Universal House of Justice, the islands of the Indian Ocean and the Federation of Rhodesia and Nyasaland each formed their own National Spiritual Assembly in 1964. Starting in 1967 the number of Baháʼís in the region was growing and it was necessary for new independent National Assemblies to be formed in those countries: 1967 - Zambia; 1970 - Botswana, Malawi, Zimbabwe; 1971 - Lesotho; 1972 - Madagascar, Mauritius, Reunion Island; 1977 - Swaziland; 1981 - Namibia; 1985 - Mozambique; 1991 - Angola; and in 1995 a re-united South Africa which included Bophuthatswana, Ciskei and Transkei.

== Apartheid ==
The 1959 Come Back, Africa film about Apartheid mentions the Baháʼí Faith as part of the discussion on the philosophical underpinnings of how the Africans were to respond to the challenge of Apartheid. The mention of the religion begins about 1 hr 10 min into the film, after the performance of Miriam Makeba. It is not known if the cause of the mention of the religion was scripted or improvised, and if by the choice of Lionel Rogosin, the filmmaker (who may have encountered the religion in Israel or the USA) or the Africans themselves because of their exposure to the religion in the country.

As another context for responding to the challenges of the period, it is known that the Sophiatown Renaissance was inspired by the Harlem Renaissance. The role of Alain Locke is key in that renaissance and Locke was a Baháʼí very involved in advocacy of Africans, African ideas, and internationalist thinking in line with the world-view of the religion.

Faced with the segregated social pattern and laws of Apartheid in South Africa, the integrated population of Baháʼís had to decide how to be composed in their administrative structures – whether the National Spiritual Assembly would be all black or all white. The Baháʼí community decided that instead of dividing the South African Baháʼí community into two population groups, one black and one white, they instead limited membership in the Baháʼí administration to black adherents, and placed the entire Baháʼí community under the leadership of its black population. In 1997 the National Spiritual Assembly presented a Statement to the Truth and Reconciliation Commission of South Africa which said in part:

Abhorring all forms of prejudice and rejecting any system of segregation, the Baháʼí Faith was introduced on a one-to-one basis and the community quietly grew during the apartheid years, without publicity. Despite the nature of the politics of that time, we presented our teachings on unity and the oneness of humankind to prominent individuals in politics, commerce and academia and leaders of thought including State Presidents.... [b]oth individual Baháʼís and our administrative institutions were continually watched by the security police.... Our activities did not include opposition to the previous Government for involvement in partisan politics and opposition to government are explicitly prohibited by the sacred Texts of our Faith.... During the time when the previous Government prohibited integration within our communities, rather than divide into separate administrative structures for each population group, we opted to limit membership of the Baháʼí Administration to the black adherents who were and remain in the majority of our membership and thereby placed the entire Baháʼí community under the stewardship of its black membership.... The pursuit of our objectives of unity and equality has not been without costs. The "white" Baháʼís were often ostracized by their white neighbours for their association with "non-whites". The Black Baháʼís were subjected to scorn by their black compatriots for their lack of political action and their complete integration with their white Baháʼí brethren. The most tragic loss to our community was the brutal execution of four of our adherents, at our places of worship, three in Mdantsane and one in Umtata.

The four Baháʼís - three adults and one youth - murdered were Houshmand Anvari, Dr Shama Bakhshandegi, Vincent and Rias Razavi. at the Baháʼí Faith Centre, Mdantsane, Ciskei, on 13 March 1994.

== Modern community ==
Since its inception the religion has had involvement in socio-economic development beginning by giving greater freedom to women, promulgating the promotion of female education as a priority concern, and that involvement was given practical expression by creating schools, agricultural coops, and clinics. The religion entered a new phase of activity when a message of the Universal House of Justice dated 20 October 1983 was released. Baháʼís were urged to seek out ways, compatible with the Baháʼí teachings, in which they could become involved in the social and economic development of the communities in which they lived. Worldwide in 1979 there were 129 officially recognized Baháʼí socio-economic development projects. By 1987, the number of officially recognized development projects had increased to 1482. Following the end of Apartheid the South African Baháʼí community in South Africa has also been involved in a variety of projects around the country. The Parliament of the World's Religions held its 1999 session in South Africa and the Baháʼís helped in its organization and operation; Dr. Marks, the South African co-chair, is a Baháʼí. In 2001 the Baháʼí International Community released two statements with regard to issues in South Africa. The first, on HIV/AIDS and gender equality issues particular to South Africa underscored the "[f]allacious notions about the naturally voracious sexual appetites of men" and "how culturally accepted social inequalities conspire with economic vulnerability to leave women and girls with little or no power to reject unwanted or unsafe sex. Yet, once infected with HIV/AIDS, women are often stigmatised as the source of the disease and persecuted, sometimes violently." The second statement was on the issue of racism. Baháʼís also participated in the follow-up to the 1992 Rio Conference on the Environment - Earth Summit 2002 held in South Africa in 2002. Some 30 representatives of six Baháʼí and Baháʼí-inspired organizations took part in the Summit including a statement entitled "Religion and Development at the Crossroads: Convergence or Divergence?". Delegations from the Baháʼí International Community, as well as the official Baháʼí communities of South Africa, Brazil, and Canada were accredited to the Summit as well as numerous sessions of Commissions of the United Nations on Sustainable Development. During the Summit the experience of South African Baháʼí community with dealing with racism, education and gender inequality was offered.

In 2004 Baháʼís Mark Bamford and wife, co-writer and producer Suzanne Kay, and their two children, who had moved from the United States to live in Cape Town, South Africa made the movie Cape of Good Hope. In 2007 two professional filmmakers finished an hourlong documentary about three Baháʼís and how they practice their faith, and the film is being aired on television in South Africa and neighbouring countries. "Baha'i Faith: A Way Forward" was produced by Ryan and Leyla Haidarian at the request of the South African Broadcasting Corporation, which has licensed rights to the documentary for two years.

In addition to a variety if singular events the Baháʼís engaged in a number of annual events. The perennial youth service and arts project "Beyond Words" has toured South African Baháʼí communities since 2000. The Association for Baháʼí Studies in Southern Africa held its seventh annual conference in 2006 at Bloemfontein, South Africa, including talks by John Grayzel, Chair, Baháʼí Studies, University of Maryland and Continental Counsellor Enos Makhele.

=== Jubiliee ===
In 2003 the Baháʼí community of South Africa celebrated their Golden Jubilee (50-year anniversary of the community) in Phokeng which was followed by satellite festivities in eight cities:Bloemfontein, Cape Town, Durban, Pretoria, Johannesburg, Sabie, Umtata, and Mafikeng. The National Spiritual Assembly's own Golden Jubilee included a 2006 commemoration by Thabo Mbeki on behalf of the Government and people of South Africa to say congratulations and best wishes to the National Spiritual Assembly of the Baháʼís of South Africa.

=== South African regional conference ===
Regional conferences were called for by the Universal House of Justice 20 October 2008 to celebrate recent achievements in grassroots community-building and to plan their next steps in organizing in their home areas. Just two weeks later twin conferences were held - one in South Africa and the other in Kenya. One regional conference was hosted by the National Spiritual Assembly of the Baháʼís of South Africa in Johannesburg in November 2008 and attracted over 1000 Baháʼís from Angola, Botswana, La Reunion, Lesotho, Madagascar, Mauritius, Mozambique, Namibia, Seychelles, South Africa, and Swaziland.

== Demographics ==
Estimates of the Baháʼís in South Africa range from around 201,000 to about 240,100 adherents by the World Christian Encyclopedia.

== Publications ==
- My African Heart by Bonnie Fitzpatrick-Moore, Paperback, 196 pages, ISBN 978-1-874801-86-3, December 1999, published by Baha'i Publishing Trust of South Africa. About an African-American Baháʼí author who moved to South Africa and lived there for a quarter century.
- Lights of the Spirit: Historical Portraits of Black Baháʼís in North America By Gwendolyn Etter-Lewis, Richard Walter Thomas, 338 pages, ISBN 1-931847-26-6, 2006, published by United States Baha'i Publishing Trust, includes several individuals who moved or made special trips to South Africa.
  - 'Abdu'l-Bahá; Shoghi Effendi (1998). That Promising Continent - - Selections from the Writings of 'Abdu'l-Bahá, the Writings and Letters of Shoghi Effendi and the Letters Written on his Behalf on Africa. Johannesburg, SA: National Spiritual Assembly of the Bahá'ís of South Africa. ISBN 9781874801801. OCLC 813530033.

== See also ==
- Religion in South Africa
- History of South Africa
- World Conference against Racism 2001
