= Women's March (South Africa) =

1956 anti-apartheid march in Pretoria

- Date: 9 August 1956
- Location: Union Buildings, Pretoria, South Africa
- Methods: Petitions

Parties
African National Congress Women's League; Federation of South African Women	Prime Minister of South Africa

Lead figures
Helen Joseph; Rahima Moosa; Sophia Williams-De Bruyn; Lilian Ngoyi	J.G. Strijdom

Women's March took place on 9 August 1956 in Pretoria, South Africa. The marchers' aims were to protest the introduction of the Apartheid pass laws for black women in 1952 and the presentation of a petition to the then Prime Minister J.G. Strijdom.

== Background ==
The organisation behind the march was Federation of South African Women, an anti-apartheid organisation for women of various groups including the ANC Women's League with the aim of strengthening female voice in the movement. They contributed to the Congress of the People in 1955, where the Freedom Charter was drawn up, by submitting a document called What Women Demand which addressed needs such as child care provisions, housing, education, equal pay, and equal rights with men in regard to property, marriage and guardianship of children. By 1956 their focus had shifted towards a protest concerning the introduction of passes for black women.

== March ==
The march took place on 9 August 1956 with an estimated 20,000 women of all races descending on Pretoria. The day of the protest was called for on a Thursday, the traditional day when black domestic workers had their day off, with the aim of ensuring a larger gathering of women. As the women arrived by train and other means, they walked to the Union Buildings, the centre of the South African Government, in small groups of twos and threes – large groups were banned by the authorities – and met at the building's gardens and amphitheatre. Leading the march were Lillian Ngoyi, Helen Joseph, Rahima Moosa and Sophia Williams-De Bruyn.

A representatives of each race group in South Africa carried 14,000 petitions for presentation to the Prime Minister J.G. Strijdom. The Prime Minister was not available, being elsewhere so as not to accept the petition from a multicultural group of women, so in his place it was accepted by his Secretary.

They then stood for thirty minutes in silence before singing "Nkosi Sikelel' iAfrika" and then sang a woman's freedom song called "Wathint' abafazi, Strijdom!"

wathint' abafazi,

wathint' imbokodo, uzo kufa!

[When] you strike the women, you strike a rock,

you will be crushed [you will die]!

— Rallying call for Women.

== Petition ==
The petition had been created by the Federation of South African Women and printed by the Indian Youth Congress. The petition reads:

We, the women of South Africa, have come here today. We African women know too well the effect this law upon our homes, our children. We, who are not African women know how our sisters suffer. For to us, an insult to African women is an insult to all women.
* That homes will be broken up when women are arrested under pass laws.
* That women and young girls will be exposed to humiliation and degradation at the hands of pass-searching policemen.
* That women will lose their right to move freely from one place to another.
We, voters and voteless, call upon your government not to issue passes to African women. We shall not resist until we have won for our children their fundamental rights of freedom, justice and security.

— Presented to Prime Minister J.G. Strijdom, 9 August 1956.

== Monument to the event ==
On 9 August 2000, National Women's Day, a monument was unveiled at the Malibongwe Embokodweni, the amphitheatre at Union Buildings in Pretoria to celebrate and commemorate the event of 1956. It is called the Monument to the Women of South Africa, a project developed by the Department of Arts, Culture, Science and Technology (DACST). A Monument Steering Committee was formed in 1999 with a judging panel established consisting of a veteran of the march, a member of the presidents office, three artists, a designer and a curator. A seven-day workshop at the Technikon Pretoria was held to enable the event to be fair and transparent and allow disadvantaged artists to participate in the competition. Sixty entries were received with the winners being Wilma Cruise and Marcus Holmes.

The final design for the monument starts on the steps of the amphitheatre with the keywords of the petition inscribed in metal on the risers. Climbing the stairs, you trigger a sound message in eleven official languages, "you strike the woman, you strike the rock". When you reach the vestibule, there in the centre lies a imbokodo, a small grinding stone atop a larger grinding stone. The stones sit atop a polished circular bronze stone surrounded by a darker bronze octagon plate. The stones symbolise the women's labour and nurturance while the bronze plates the earth and stone they sit upon.

== Notable participants ==
- Frances Baard
- Bertha Gxowa
- Helen Joseph
- Fatima Meer
- Ruth Mompati
- Florence Mkhize (as an organizer)
- Rahima Moosa
- Rita Ndzanga
- Lilian Ngoyi
- Albertina Sisulu
- Sophia Williams-De Bruyn
- Annie Peters
- Nosipho Dastile
- Lilian Diedricks
