= Nokuthula Nqaba =

South African politician

Secretary-general of the African National Congress Women's League (ANCWL)
- Incumbent
- Assumed office July 2023
- Preceded by: Mookgo Matuba

Personal details
- Party: African National Congress (ANC)

Nokuthula Nqaba is a South African politician and was elected as secretary-general of the African National Congress Women's League (ANCWL) in July 2023.

== Biography ==
Nqaba was elected as secretary-general of the African National Congress Women's League (ANCWL) in July 2023. She was elected with 1611 votes, with competitor Lydia Moroane-Zitha receiving 1081 votes and Weziwe Tikane-Gxothiwe receiving 229 votes. She succeeded Mookgo Matuba.

Nqaba has advocated for strengthening bilateral relations with China and Russia. She has refused to stand with African National Congress (ANC) members accused of corruption.

Nqaba has called for government action from the departments of Basic Education, Health, Social Development, Justice and Constitutional Development to reduce teenage pregnancies. She has delivered a memorandum detailing ANCWL demands for governmental response to gender-based violence and femicide (GBVF) to the Union Buildings in Pretoria, calling for mandatory training of police and judicial officials, and increased funding for shelters, counselling centres and legal aid. She has also pushed for immediate deportation of undocumented foreign nationals.

Nqaba has advocated for the ANC North West and Mpumalanga provincial executives to include women to comply with the ANC 50/50 policy on gender parity. She has also stated that she will lobby for female representation in the officials list at 56th National Conference of the African National Congress in 2027.

Nqaba has featured on an episode of the podcast "Politricking with Tshidi Madia."
