= Veronica Sobukwe =

South African anti-apartheid activist

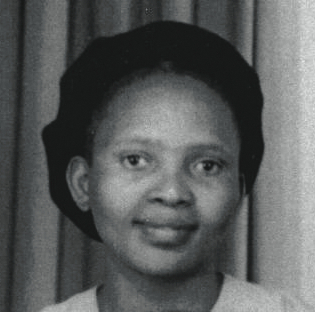

Zondeni Veronica Sobukwe OLS (27 July 1927 – 15 August 2018) was a South African nurse who played an integral role in the Defiance Campaign. Her husband, Robert Sobukwe, was a prominent political dissident. Her family was constantly harassed by the police.

== Background ==
Veronica Sobukwe (née Mate) was born on July 27, 1927, in Hlobane, KwaZulu-Natal. Sobukwe was a trainee nurse at Victoria Hospital in Lovedale, Eastern Cape. Victoria Hospital was established in 1898 through the Lovedale Missionary Institution and it was the first hospital in South Africa to train black nurses. While Zondeni Sobukwe was a trainee, she got involved in a labour dispute with hospital management.

The dispute escalated to strike action and Sobukwe was one of the leaders, which caught the attention of Robert Sobukwe who was the president of the Student Representative Council at Fort Hare University in 1949. Zondeni Sobukwe was expelled from Lovedale College the same year for her participation in the Victoria Hospital Strike. After her expulsion, the Fort Hare ANC Youth League sent Sobukwe to Johannesburg to deliver a letter to Walter Sisulu to bring to his attention the struggles of the nurses in Alice.

On 6 June 1954, she married Robert Sobukwe and they had four children, Miliswa, Dinilesizwe, Dalindyebo and Dedanizizwe. After they married she worked at Jabavu Clinic in Soweto. While her husband was in prison, Zondeni unsuccessfully petitioned Jimmy Kruger and Prime Minister B.J. Vorster, demanding the release of her husband so that he could get medical treatment at home.

In a bid to find the truth about the cause of her husband's death, Zondeni Sobukwe testified to the Truth and Reconciliation Commission in King Williams Town on May 12, 1997.

She died on 15 August 2018 at the age of 91 years after a long illness.

== Honours ==
The ANC's Regional Headquarters in Nelson Mandela Bay was renamed Florence Matomela House in November 2012. Ms Angie Motshekga, then Minister of Basic Education and President of the ANC Women's League described Florence Matomela, at the Florence Mathomela Memorial Lecture, as having battled 'triple oppression', i.e. colonial, patriarchal and class domination. The Red Location Museum in New Brighton held a year-long exhibition dedicated to these women of the liberation struggle, by paying tribute to Florence Matomela, Nontuthuzelo Mabala, Veronica Sobukwe, Lilian Diedricks and Nosipho Dastile.
