= Helen Joseph Hospital =

Coordinates: 26.183555°S 27.990097°E

Geography
- Location: Auckland Park, Johannesburg, Gauteng, South Africa

Organisation
- Type: Teaching
- Affiliated university: University of Witwatersrand
- Network: Gauteng Department of Health

History
- Founded: 1967

Links
- Website: Helen Joseph Hospital
- Lists: Hospitals in South Africa

Helen Joseph Hospital is a public hospital based in Auckland Park, Johannesburg, South Africa. Prior to 1997, it was known as the J.G. Strijdom Hospital. As a teaching hospital, its affiliated to the University of Witwatersrand's Medical School.

== History ==
The hospital was opened in 1967 and was called the J.G. Strijdom Hospital, named after J.G. Strijdom, a South African Prime Minister. The hospital would be renamed 1 April 1997, after anti-apartheid activist Helen Joseph. By 1985 it became an academic hospital, out-patient facilities and clinics. The hospital also has a provincial nurses training facility called the Ann Latsky Nursing College which opened in 1981. In 1995, all obstetrics and gynaecology departments were moved from the J.G. Strijdom Hospital to the Coronation Hospital now called the Rahima Moosa Mother and Child Hospital. In 2022 it was described as a delinquent rate payer, when it was over R44 million in arrears with its municipal bills.

== Facilities ==
The hospital is affiliated with the University of Witwatersrand's Medical School and responsible for the teaching of healthcare workers and providing tertiary health services the Johannesburg community. It has two admission wards, nine medical wards, four surgical wards, two orthopedic wards, a psychiatric unit, ICU and a high-care unit. It has eleven functioning operating theatres.

It has a number of specialised clinics on the health campus such as a Stoma unit, Renal Dialysis Unit, Pain Clinic, Endoscopy Unit, Breast Clinic, and the Thembalethu HIV clinic. The Thembalethu Clinic opened in 1992 and treats patients diagnosed with HIV, Aids and Tuberculosis.
