= Nosipho Dastile =

South African activist (1938–2009)

Nosipho Dastile (1938–2009) was a community and anti-Apartheid activist in the small town of Uitenhage, just outside Port Elizabeth, Eastern Cape Province, South Africa. She was elected councillor under the banner of what was then the new democratically constituted Uitenhage Transitional Local Council from 1994 to 1999.

== Early life ==
Nosipho Dastile was born in 1938 in Uitenhage, where she attended her junior and secondary school education. After completing her education, she began working as a community activist in the Uitenhage area, particularly focused on education. Part of her community work was that she volunteered as a teacher at the Roman Catholic Mission School and later moved on to the Little Flower Primary School, where she worked as a full-time teacher. During the high tide of political activism in South Africa, after the institutionalization of Apartheid as the official political governing system, she became active in politics and was one of the founding members of the United Democratic Front (UDF) in Uitenhage. Her political activism grew from strength to strength and in an election held at the Uitenhage Town Hall, she was elected the inaugural president of the Uitenhage Women’s Organisation.

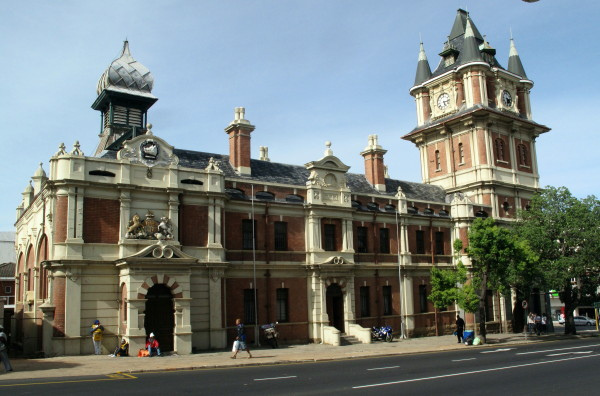
Uitenhage Victoria Tower, South Africa

== Political life ==
Soon after the unbanning of political parties and exiled freedom fighters constituting the liberation movement in 1990, Nosipho was elected as the chairperson of the African National Congress Women’s League (ANCWL) for the Uitenhage region. She continued her activist work and serving the people and community of Uitenhage and in 1994 was elected as the first councillor under the banner of the new democratically constituted Uitenhage Transitional Local Council for a period spanning five years until 1999. After this, she took time away from political life due to an illness but continued to volunteer as a teacher at the Ruth Dano crèche in Uitenhage. She subsequently died in May 2009 at the age of 71 years. She was peacefully laid to rest amongst her people on 23 May 2009 at the Kwanobuhle Cemetery with prominent ANC political figures in attendance.

== Honours ==
The ANC regional offices in Port Elizabeth, Eastern Cape are named Florence Matomela House. The artist Nombulelo Dassie created a sculpture of Florence Matomela. A year long exhibition curated by Nomabaso Bedeshe was held at Red Location Museum honouring Florence Matomela, Nontuthuzelo Mabala, Veronica Sobukwe, Lilian Diedricks and Nosipho Dastile. The exhibition included the biographies and photographs of the five women.

== See also ==
- SABC News
- The Herald Live
