= Ray Alexander Simons =

South African communist activist and trade unionist

- Born: Rachel Ester Alexandrowich; 31 December 1913; Varakļāni, Latvia,
- Died: 12 September 2004 (aged 90); Cape Town, South Africa
- Occupations: Anti-apartheid activist Trade union Campaigner
- Spouses: Eli Weinberg (m. 1937; div. 1940); Jack Simons (m. 1941; died 1995)
- Children: Mary Simons; Tanya Barben; Johan Simons

Ray Alexander Simons (née Alexandrowich; (31 December 1913 – 12 September 2004) was a South African communist, anti-apartheid activist, campaigner and trade unionist who helped draft the Women's Charter. She moved to Cape Town in 1929 to escape the persecution of Jews and communists.

== Early life ==
Simons was born in Varklia (Varakļāni), Latvia as Rachel Ester Alexandrowich on 31 December 1913. She was one of six children from Simka Simon and Dobe Alexandrowich. Her father was a teacher of Russian language, German Language and mathematics. He also ran a cheder where the Jewish boys studied talmud and prepared their bar mizvah. She lived in a household full of books which exposed her to socialist and communist ideologist. Her father died when she was 12 years old. His best friend, Leib Jaffe, influenced Ray's thinking about socialist ideas and awareness of the vital function of organization to advance worker's right. The death of her father caused Simons to become an atheist.

At the age of 13, she joined the underground Latvian Communist Party. When Simons was fourteen, she was invited to participate in a debate on the Balfour Declaration which was held by local Zionist organization. She declined because she believed that the fight against antisemitism should be a part of broader humanity's strive to achieve a new order of the world where all humankind would be free, including Jews. Because of persecution of Jews in Varakļāni, she was sent to Riga to advance her studies at the ORT technical college and lived with her close friend Leah.

== Cape Town ==
After Leah was arrested for her political activities, her mother was worried and immediately arranged for Simons to live with her sister in Cape Town. 17 October 1929 she left Varaklan on board German East Afrika Liner, Ubena and arrived at Cape Town to meet her sister at the docks on 6 November 1929, a day before the anniversary of the Russian Revolution. Five days after her arrival on 11 November 1929, she met Cissie Gool and lifelong friend John Gomas and joined the Communist Party of South Africa (CPSA). At that time, Simons was 16 years old.

Simons was fired from her first job after she participated in the anti-pass campaign. She became increasingly involved in trade union activity after she was fired from her job because of her attendance at founding conference of the Anti-Fascist League. Simon was elected as the chair of the Cape Town District Committee of the Communist Party in January 1931. Simon worked in a dress shop and accompanied James Schuba who she met at the meeting of the party on the weekends to visit dock and harbour workers. Three years after her arrival, she was elected to be Secretary of the Commercial Employees' Union in Cape Town. In 1935, she lost her job at the dress shop and she became full-time organizer of the Non-European Railway and Harbor Workers' Union She was also a Secretary of the Communist Party for two years, from 1934 to 1935.

Simons founded Food and Canning Workers Union (FCWU) by organising coloured, black and white workers which was known for its effectiveness and militancy. It spread through the fruit canning industry of the Boland to the west coast among fishing communities. She became General Secretary of the organization. FCWU played an important role in the South African Congress of Trade Unions on the 1950s. Using Suppression of Communism Act of 1950 to ban the communist party in 1953, she was ordered to quit the position next year.

Ray Alexander Simons, Helen Joseph, Lilian Ngoyi and Florence Mkhize found the Federation of South African Women (FSAW) in April 1954 and she was elected to be General Secretary of the organization. Though, in September 1954, she met with a series of banning orders issued by C. R. Swart which forced her to resign from (FSAW). In the same year, Simons was elected as one of the three Natives' Representative in South Africa's parliament. Although the banning order forbid her from taking her seat, she still went to the parliament and pushed by a security policeman on the premise. She sued the act and received compensation which covered the cost of her election campaign.

== Exile life ==
In 1965, she and her husband Jack Simons fled to Lusaka, Zambia. Jack received a lecturer position at Manchester University and moved to England. They returned to Zambia in 1967 and built a home for themselves for their three children's visitation. While in exile at Zambia, Ray co-authored a book called Class and Colour in South Africa, 1850–1950 with Jack Simons and worked for the International Labour Organization and African National Congress (ANC) which was banned in South Africa. They had lived in Zambia for most of 25 years between 1965 and 1990. In her exile in 1986, she was elected as Honorary President of the Food and Allied Workers' Union. They returned from exile in 1990.

== Personal life ==
Ray Alexander married Eli Weinberg when Eli was the acting Secretary to the local committee of the South African Trades and Labour Council. They separated on 2 May 1940. In 1941, she married Jack Simons, a lecturer at the University of Cape Town and a fellow communist. They had three children. She died in Cape Town on 12 September 2004 at the age of 91.

== Award and legacy ==
She was awarded the Isitwalandwe Medal in 2004 by the African National Congress. Ray Alexander Simons Memory Centre and Heritage Square in Gugulethu was built and launched by Deputy President of South Africa, Kgalema Motlanthe on 6 November 2010.

Order for Meritorious Service in silver (2003).

In March 2011, the country of Sierra Leone issued a postage stamp in her honor, naming her as one of the Legendary Heroes of Africa.
