= African National Congress Women's League =

Women wing of the African National Congress

- Abbreviation: ANCWL
- President: Sisi Tolashe
- Secretary-General: Nokuthula Nqaba
- Founded: 1948
- Headquarters: Luthuli House; 54 Sauer Street; Johannesburg; Gauteng

Website
- womensleague.anc.org.za

The African National Congress Women's League (ANCWL) is an auxiliary women's political organization of the African National Congress (ANC) of South Africa. This organization has its precedent in the Bantu Women's League, and it oscillated from being the Women's Section to the Women's League from its founding, through the exile years, and in a post-apartheid South Africa. After women were allowed to become members of the ANC in 1943, the ANCWL was created as the means by which Black South African women could contribute to the national liberation struggle by channeling Black women's political activity into the ANC by way of the ANCWL.

From its founding until the present the organization's structure, internal debates, and activity have been influenced by critical events in the national liberation struggle and by the ultimate authority of the ANC. Although the ANCWL was established as a way to incorporate women and their issues into the ANC, there are conflicting accounts over the extent to which women and their issues were represented by this organization, the degree to which organizational autonomy was desired, and the organization's relationship with feminist politics. After the ANC was allowed to return to South Africa in 1990, the ANCWL returned to being a formal organization within the ANC.

The most recent president of the ANCWL was Bathabile Dlamini, who held the office from 2015 until April 2022, when the entire national executive of the league was disbanded by the National Executive Committee of the mainstream ANC.

== Bantu Women's League ==
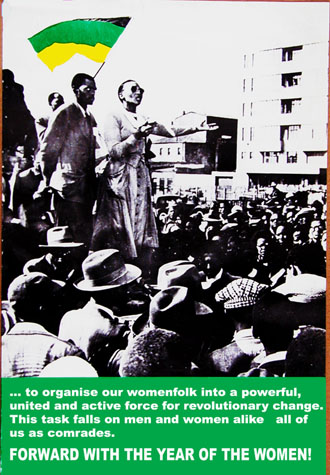
Viola Hashe, blind trade union leader, speaking at a 1952 rally during the "Defiance Campaign". Photo taken in Fordsburg, Johannesburg; poster designed for African National Congress South Africa in Lusaka, to commemorate 1984 as "Year of the Women"

The Bantu Women's League (BWL) was founded in 1913 by Dr. Charlotte Manye Maxeke as a part of the ANC but without full membership rights. It was founded to give organization to women's issues and to channel women's politics into the ANC's nationalist struggle. The organization operated on the ANC's patriarchal nationalist conception of women's political interests as solely issues that inhibited women in their roles as wives and mothers. A central issue that led to its formation were the attempts by the Orange Free State province to require Black women to carry passes. Passes were documents that were used as a means by which local state authorities and white capitalists could regulate the movement of Black South Africans, most of whom were migrant workers. The pass was seen as a symbol of racist oppression and the Bantu Women's League was built to channel women's militancy in order to protest the passes. Black men had already been required to carry passes. Whites did not have to carry passes.

In 1912, the BWL obtained 5000 Black and Colored women's signatures. The petition was sent to Prime Minister Louis Bothaasking, requesting the repeal of the pass laws. The women received no response. In response and led by Maxeke, the members burned their passes in front of municipal offices while chanting, protest and even fighting with police. Many members were arrested in Jagersfontein, Winburg and Bloemfontein. This militant action by the women resulted in the exclusion of women from the pass laws until 1956 when the South African government attempted to subject women to pass laws again. The mass mobilization of the women caught the ANC by surprise; this high level of political activity continued throughout the interwar period, prompting the ANC to reconsider the role of women in the nationalist struggle. The women made up a powerful political constituency, and the ANC was building a mass base to achieve its goal of national liberation.

== History ==
=== Early years: 1948–1960 ===
The interwar period was marked by an increase in Black women's mobilization against apartheid. The increase in secondary industry and the reduction of the reserve economy prompted the mass urbanization of women into townships, creating the conditions for a massive wave of resistance in the 1940s and 1950s. In 1943, the ANC decided to allow women to join the organization as full members. In 1948, the ANC created the Women's League, the organization that was to be the home for women members of the ANC and the mechanism through which their politics and participation would be directed. Madie Hall-Xuma became the first president of the auxiliary organization, and the organization was allowed to govern itself within the boundaries set by the ANC.

Almost immediately following the creation of the ANCWL there began debates within the organization about whether the ANCWL should be a more autonomous or decentralized organization for advancing women's politics and position within the nationalist movement and in the future post-apartheid state. In 1945, the Executive Committee of the ANCWL passed a resolution to allow itself to establish branches wherever the ANC already had a presence, indicating a step towards building up a political organization for women in the ANC. This was rejected by the ANC on the grounds that it would be promoting a parallel feminist organization that could foster divisions within the nationalist movement. The tension between feminism and the nationalist movement was a constant struggle that ultimately resulted in a cyclical pattern of "double militancy" for women in the ANC; women had to struggle against the patriarchal notions of women's roles in the ANC's nationalism, struggle for a political space for women, and struggle against critiques or attacks from their mostly male comrades when they tried to seek autonomy for the ANCWL. Despite this, women's own political strength would push against assumed gender roles within the ANC.

The ANC had asked it to help in organizing the 1955 Congress of the people, where the Freedom Charter was adopted. Then secretary-general of the ANC, Oliver Tambo, remarked that the "Women's League is not just an auxiliary to the ANC and we know that we cannot win liberation or build a strong movement without the participation of women." This remark was made coming off of the heels of the ANCWL's large involvement in the Defiance Campaign, which saw women members taking important roles and leading massive actions. Women saw the leverage this gave them and took the opportunity to demand that their demands be incorporated into the charter. On August 9, 1956, league members representing the Federation of South African Women, confronted Prime Minister J. G. Strydom with a petition against pass laws.

The experience of the Defiance Campaign also led to the ANCWL's role in creating the Federation of South African Women (FEDSAW), a parallel organization that the ANC could bring into the national liberation struggle through the ANCWL's key membership and leadership in the federation.

=== Dormancy: 1960–1990 ===
On March 22, 1960, in the township of Sharpeville, South African police forces opened fire on a demonstration of Black South Africans against the pass laws. 69 people were killed by the police, and riots spread across South Africa in response to the massacre at Sharpeville. The National Party government declared a state of emergency and moved to ban the ANC and the Pan African Congress, among others. While the organization was banned, some members created organizations such as the Federation of Transvaal Women (FEDTRAW), Natal Organisation of Women (NOW) and United Women's Congress (UWCO) in the Western Cape. The ANC itself operated primarily in exile from headquarters in Lusaka, Zambia; the Women's League became dormant, although much of its work was continued by the "Women's Section" of the mainstream ANC, which had multiple branches across different exile states. Leaders of the section included Florence Mophosho and Gertrude Shope. The formal roles of the women in the Women's Section was to act as "social workers" for the members in exile. However, women in exile also took on roles of diplomats, like in the case of Mophosho, or they were able to rethink their politics and incorporate a feminist politics into their nationalist struggle through encounters with feminists in other countries, like the feminists of the People's Movement for the Liberation of Angola. This was an important period for ANC women in exile because when they were allowed to return in 1990, they would bring the lessons from these political exchanges into advocating for advancing the status of women in a post-apartheid South Africa and its new constitution.

=== Revival: 1990–2022 ===
==== Shope presidency: 1991–1993 ====
Several months after the ANC was unbanned by the apartheid government, the ANCWL was relaunched in Durban on 9 August 1990, the anniversary of the famous 1956 Women's March. In April 1991 the league held its first national conference in several decades in Kimberley and elected Gertrude Shope as ANCWL president. Winnie Madikizela-Mandela also stood for the presidency but was elected in a vote, receiving only 196 votes to Shope's 633; Albertina Sisulu had declined a nomination to stand for the presidency and had reportedly supported Shope's campaign, and she was elected ANCWL deputy president. Baleka Mbete (then known as Baleka Kgositsile) was elected secretary-general.

At the 48th National Conference of the mainstream ANC in July 1991, in a highly charged plenary session, the ANCWL failed to garner the requisite support for its proposal to insert gender quotas into the ANC constitution.

==== Madikizela-Mandela presidency: 1993–2003 ====
Shope was replaced as president by Madikizela-Mandela in December 1993, at the ANCWL's second national conference; the conference also elected Thandi Modise as deputy president and Nosiviwe Mapisa-Nqakula as secretary-general. Adelaide Tambo was elected treasurer-general.

On 11 February 1995, eleven members of the ANCWL national executive resigned from their positions in protest of Madikizela-Mandela's leadership, vaguely citing undemocratic practices and a lack of accountability. The Mail & Guardian said that treasurer-general Tambo led the walk-out, and the group also included secretary-general Mapisa-Nqakula and former secretary-general Mbete, as well as Ruth Mompati, Nomvula Mokonyane, Mavivi Myakayaka-Manzini, Nkosazana Dlamini-Zuma, and Lindiwe Zulu. The ANC sent in its own national leadership to attempt to mediate the dispute: the women met with Deputy President Thabo Mbeki and then, reportedly for four hours, with President Nelson Mandela. Upon Madikizela-Mandela's death in 2018, it was still not clear exactly what precipitated the protest; most of the women later rejoined the ANCWL.

At the ANC's 50th National Conference in December 1997, the ANCWL nominated its president, Madikizela-Mandela, for the deputy presidency of the mainstream ANC, but the nomination was invalidated on a technicality. An attempt by the ANCWL to nominate her again, this time from the floor of the conference, also failed. Although Madikizela-Mandela was elected to a second term as ANCWL president at the league's 1997 conference, she was convicted of fraud and theft in April 2003 and resigned from the office. Modise stepped in as acting president.

==== Mapisa-Nqakula presidency: 2003–2008 ====
In subsequent months, Modise and Mapisa-Nqakula were engaged in a heated contest to succeed Madikizela-Mandela. Manto Tshabalala-Msimang was also nominated for the presidency but declined to stand in the election. At the national conference in August 2003, the ANCWL's fourth since 1990, Mapisa-Nqakula prevailed and was elected ANCWL president, beating Modise by 528 votes. The conference also elected Mavivi Myakayaka-Manzini as deputy president and Bathabile Dlamini as secretary-general.

This leadership complement was viewed as aligned to the incumbent ANC president and national president, Thabo Mbeki. In the fierce campaigning that preceded the mainstream ANC's 52nd National Conference in December 2007, the ANCWL reportedly supported Mbeki's unsuccessful bid for re-election as ANC president, although secretary general Dlamini supported his opponent, Jacob Zuma. The Mail & Guardian reported that Mbeki had secured the league's support by selecting Nkosazana Dlamini-Zuma (a provincial leader of the ANCWL in KwaZulu-Natal at that time) as his running mate.

==== Motshekga presidency: 2008–2015 ====
At the ANCWL national conference in 2008, outgoing secretary-general Dlamini contested with Angie Motshekga for election to the presidency; Motshekga won the vote. Also elected at the conference were Nosiphiwo Mwambi as deputy president, Sisisi Tolashe as secretary-general, Mpai Mogori as deputy secretary-general, and Hlengiwe Mkhize as treasurer. Motshekga remained in the presidency until 2013 – although the league's constitution required it to hold national conferences every five years, the conference was delayed by two years.

==== Dlamini presidency: 2015–2022 ====
When the next conference was held in Pretoria in August 2015, it hosted a repeat of the 2008 leadership battle; on this occasion, Dlamini won, earning 1,537 votes to Motshekga's 1,081. Sisi Ntombela was elected unopposed as ANCWL deputy president, and Maite Nkoana-Mashabane was elected treasurer, winning in a vote against Edna Molewa. Mookgo Matuba beat Tolashe in a vote to take her post as secretary-general, and Weziwe Tikana was elected Matuba's deputy.

On 1 April, incumbent ANCWL president Dlamini was convicted on perjury charges; there was some controversy within the ANC about whether the mainstream organisation's so-called step-aside rule required Dlamini to step down as ANCWL president following her conviction. Ultimately, later in April, the ANC National Executive Committee announced that, while Dlamini would not be required to "step aside", the entire national executive of the ANCWL would be disbanded because it had exceeded its five-year term. The disbandment ended Dlamini and other national leaders' terms and leadership of the ANCWL was entrusted to an interim task team, pending fresh leadership elections.

== Controversy ==
=== Alleged North West fraud ===
The ANCWL in the North West suspended three of its members. The League's Provincial Executive Committee (PEC) placed three of its executive members on leave on January 21, 2022 due to fraud accusations. The accusation was that the three individuals were plotting to illegally take money from the party. The issue allegedly lay with provincial secretary Briget Tlhomelang, who at the time was not the secretary but still accessed the ANC's bank accounts. The suspended chairperson, Fetsang Molosiwa, claimed only the party's executive committee could suspend the three and not the PEC. An investigation was underway in early 2022.

== List of leaders ==
The top national leadership of the ANCWL are elected at regular national conferences; the 12th was held in August 2015.

=== President ===
Since the ANCWL was relaunched in 1990, its presidents have been:

- Gertrude Shope (1991–1993)
- Winnie Madikizela-Mandela (1993–2003)
- Thandi Modise (acting, 2003)
- Nosiviwe Mapisa-Ngakula (2003–2008)
- Angie Motshekga (2008–2015)
- Bathabile Dlamini (2015–2022)
- Sisisi Tolashe (2023–present)

=== Deputy president ===
- Albertina Sisulu (1991–1993)
- Thandi Modise (1993–2003)
- Mavivi Myakayaka-Manzini (2003–2008)
- Nosiphiwo Mwambi (2008–2015)
- Sisi Ntombela (2015–2022)
- Lungi Mnganga-Gcabashe (2023–present)

=== Secretary-general ===
- Baleka Mbete (1991–1993)
- Nosiviwe Mapisa-Nqakula (1993–1995)
- Bathabile Dlamini (1998–2008)
- Sisisi Tolashe (2008–2015)
- Mookgo Matuba (2015–2022)
- Nokuthula Nqaba (2023–present)

== Notable persons ==
In 1956, Lilian Ngoyi became the first elected female member of the ANC National Executive Committee.

Among the activists and politicians who were allied with the ANC during the apartheid decades are:

- Ray Alexander and Rayn Alexander
- Frances Baard
- Nokukhanya Bhengu
- Madi Gray
- Frene Ginwala
- Helen Joseph
- Winnie Madikizela-Mandela
- Ida Mntwana
- Yolisa Modise
- Rahima Moosa
- Florence Mophosho
- Ruth Mompati
- Florence Mophosho
- Lillian Ngoyi
- Dorothy Nyembe
- Albertina Sisulu

Many of these women were members of the ANCWL or worked with them in organizations like FEDSAW to advance the national liberation struggle.
