= Frances Baard =

South African trade unionist and politician

Frances Goitsemang Baard
- Born: Frances Maswabi (or Masuabi); 13 June 1909; Green Point, Beaconsfield, Kimberley
- Died: 1997 at the age of 87
- Other name: Frances Maswabi (or Masuabi)
- Education: Racecourse Primary School and the Lyndhurst Road School in Malay Camp, Kimberley, Perseverance School
- Occupations: Trade unionist, organiser
- Organization(s): African National Congress Women's League, United Democratic Front, South African Congress of Trade Unions
- Known for: Helped draft the Freedom Charter; one of the leaders of the 1956 Women's march to the Union Buildings in Pretoria; one of the defendants in the Treason Trial; protest against the pass laws
- Spouse: Bamboo Baard
- Parent(s): Spider Man Maswabi, Sarah Voss

Frances Goitsemang Baard OMSS OLG (1 October 1909 – 1997) was a South African (ethnic Tswana) trade unionist, organiser for the African National Congress Women's League and a Patron of the United Democratic Front, who was commemorated in the renaming of the Diamantveld District Municipality (Kimberley) as the Frances Baard District Municipality. Schoeman Street in Pretoria was also renamed in her honour. This heroine is the reason we celebrate National Women's Day today in South Africa.

== Early life and education ==
Baard (also referred to as Frances Maswabi (or Masuabi)) was born Frances Maswabi (or Masuabi), in Green Point, Beaconsfield, Kimberley, on 1 October 1909 (other sources suggest 1901). Her father was Herman Maswabi from Ramotswa in Botswana, who had gone to Kimberley to work on the mines, while her mother, Sarah Voss, was a Tswana person from Kimberley. She married Lucas Baard in Port Elizabeth in 1942, having known him from school days in Kimberley.

She attended the Racecourse Primary School and the Lyndhurst Road School in Malay Camp, Kimberley, before enrolling for a short time at Kimberley's famous Perseverance School (cut short owing to the death of her father). She worked briefly as a teacher and then, moving to Port Elizabeth, as a domestic servant and a factory worker.

== Political awakening ==
It was at this time that Baard became an activist in the African National Congress, which she joined in 1948, and a trade unionist, as a result of her experiences of oppression and exploitation under Apartheid. She was influenced by Raymond Mhlaba and Ray Alexander.

She was an organiser in the African National Congress Women's League in 1952 at the time of the Defiance Campaign, serving later in various posts including Secretary and Treasurer of the League's Port Elizabeth branch. In the mid 1950s she served as National Treasurer of the Women's League and was also an executive committee member and local Port Elizabeth branch President of the Federation of South African Women (FEDSAW).

=== Freedom Charter and Women's March ===
Baard was actively involved in 1955 in the drafting of the Freedom Charter and was one of the leaders of the Women's march to the Union Buildings in Pretoria on 9 August 1956 in protest against the pass laws.

“A pass is this little book you must get when you are 16 and it says where you can work, and where you can be, and if you have got work. You can't get a job without this book. And you can only get a job where they stamp your pass to say 'Johannesburg' or 'Pretoria' and so on. You must carry it with you all the time because the police can ask you, 'Where is your pass?' any time, and then you must show them. If you haven't got your pass, they put you in jail for some days or else you must pay some money to get out." – Frances Baard, in "My Spirit is not Banned"

In 1956 she was one of the defendants in the Treason Trial and became an executive committee member of the South African Congress of Trade Unions (SACTU).

In 1959, Baard assisted with the potato boycott to protest the treatment of workers in Bethal, Transvaal.

=== Imprisonment ===
She was arrested in 1960 and then again in 1963 when she was kept in solitary confinement for 12 months. In 1964 she was arrested yet again under the Suppression of Communism Act for her involvement with ANC activities, being sentenced to 5 years imprisonment. Her children were taken care of by relatives in Port Elizabeth and Kimberley.

=== Banishment and subsequent political activity ===
Following her release in 1969, she was banished to Boekenhout, moving two years later when her banning order expired to Mabopane (near Pretoria) where she died in 1997. In August 1983 Frances Baard attended the launch of the United Democratic Front (UDF) in Cape Town, being elected a Patron and executive member.

Baard was a member of the Methodist Church and of its Women's Guild.

== Commemorated in the place of her birth and elsewhere ==
In June 2001, the "Diamantveld District Council", Kimberley, was renamed Frances Baard District Municipality in honour of Frances Baard. The suggestion to recognise Frances Baard arose originally from a staff-member at Kimberley's McGregor Museum.

In commemoration of this daughter of Kimberley and the Northern Cape, and of her role in the Women's March on 9 August 1956, a bronze statue of her was unveiled in Kimberley by the Premier of the Northern Cape, Mrs Hazel Jenkins, on 9 August 2009. The inscription on the granite plinth cites the famous remark from her autobiography:

"My spirit is not banned – I still say I want freedom in my lifetime."

Baard is also remembered in the renaming of Schoeman Street (previously named after State President Stephanus Schoeman) in Pretoria, where however the spelling in street signs and on maps is given as "Francis Baard". Baard's grand daughter Mummy Baard remarked that "the Tshwane Metro Council is right in using 'Francis' on its new street name." Asked why, in contrast, the Frances Baard District Council uses a different spelling, she suggested that "maybe they decided to go for the 'coloured version' of the name."
