= Federation of South African Women =

Political lobbing group

FEDSAW
- Federation of South African Women
- Federasie van Suid-Afrikaanse Vroue
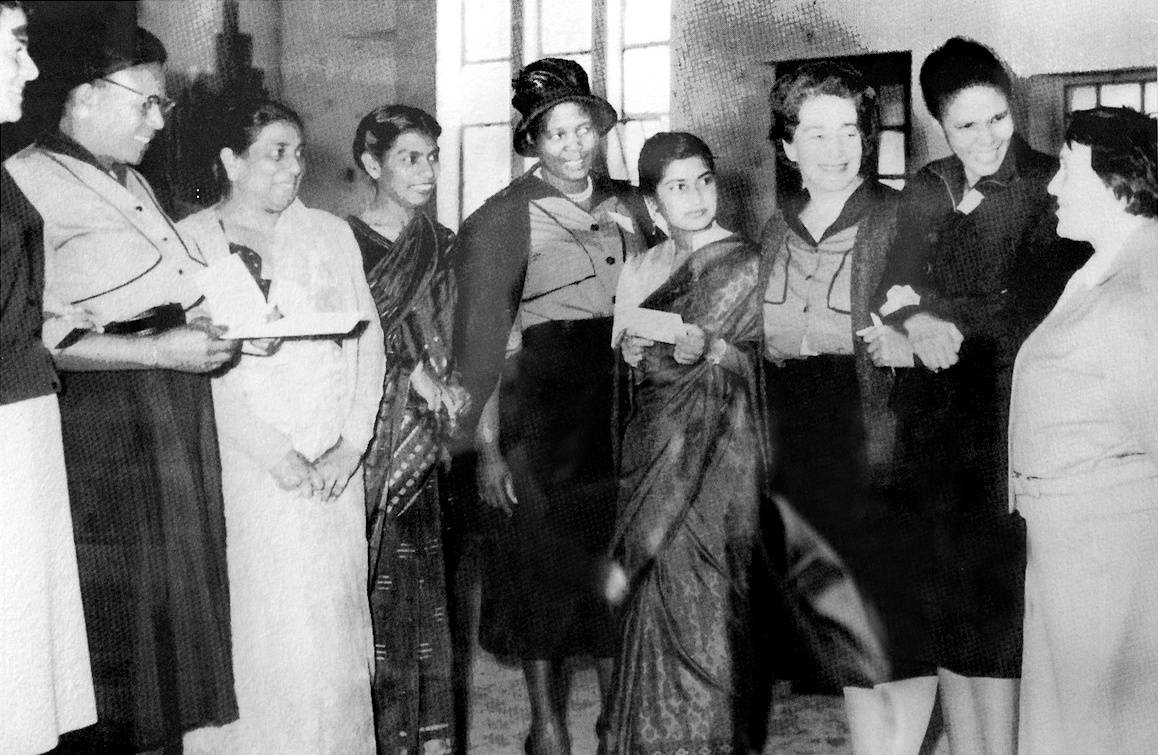
- FEDSAW members in an anti-apartheid meeting
- Abbreviation: FEDSAW
- Formation: 17 April 1954
- Founder: Ray Alexander Simons, Hilda Bernstein, Lilian Ngoyi, Ida Mntwana, Frances Baard, Helen Joseph, Amina Cachalia
- Founded at: Johannesburg, South Africa
- Dissolved: Defunct by the mid-1960s
- Type: Anti-apartheid organization; Women's rights organization
- Legal status: Defunct
- Headquarters: Johannesburg, South Africa
- Region served: South Africa
- Methods: Protests, political lobbying, petitioning, mass mobilization
- Members: 146 delegates representing approx. 230,000 women (at founding) (1954)
- Official language: English
- President: Ida Mntwana (1954–1956); Lilian Ngoyi (1956–)
- General Secretary: Ray Alexander Simons (1954); Helen Joseph
- Key people: Florence Matomela, Rahima Moosa, Albertina Sisulu
- Affiliations: Congress Alliance: African National Congress Women's League, South African Coloured People's Organisation, South African Congress of Democrats, Food and Canning Workers' Union, South African Indian Congress

The Federation of South African Women (FEDSAW) was a political lobby group formed in 1954. At FEDSAW's inaugural conference, a Women's Charter was adopted. Its founding was spear-headed by Lillian Ngoyi.

== Introduction ==
The Federation of South African Women (FEDSAW) was a multi-racial women's organization and lobby group which organized and protested against the institutional Apartheid Regime that was present throughout South Africa.

Whilst South Africa had many forms of societal segregation prior to Apartheid, its institutionalization through governmental policy led its founders to organize against several issues, such as rising costs and the pass law system. As a result, FEDSAW became part of the Congress Alliance, an anti-apartheid coalition led by the African National Congress (ANC). The organization is also most notable for organizing the Women's March 1956, one of the largest protests of the pass laws to take place in the 1950s.

FEDSAW is notable because of its achievement in creating one of the first broad-based women's organizations in the country's history.

== History ==
=== Formation ===
Rachel Simons, trade unionist and member of the South African Communist Party, Frances Baard, of the African Food and Canning Workers Union, and Florence Matomela, president of the ANC Women's League (ANCWL) in the Eastern Cape, organized an informal gathering of women at the Port Elizabeth Annual Trades and Labour council conference. During this informal meeting, a clear concern for issues regarding women and the welfare of their families were expressed - pass laws, which segregated and strictly regulated the movement of black and coloured people. Other issues expressed were rising food and transportation costs. Furthermore, a rise in the price of bread in mid-1953 had mobilized women in Cape Town to organize politically, further stimulating an interest in the establishment of a women's interest lobby. FEDSAW was thus created as the first attempt at a broad-based and multi-racial women's organization to help meet women's basic needs and those of their family.

=== FEDSAW Conference of 1954 ===
The first FEDSAW conference took place on April 17, 1954. Approximately 150 delegates attended the conference, including representatives of the ANCWL, Transvaal All Women's Union, Congress of Democrats, the Indian Congress and trade unionists. At the conference, the aims and philosophy of the organization were established and recorded through the Women's Charter. A National Executive Committee was also selected.

=== Protests of the Union Building in Pretoria, 1955 ===
One of the first protests that FEDSAW coordinated took place on October 27, 1955, outside the Pretoria Union Buildings, which form the official seat of the South African government as well as the offices of the President of South Africa. This was in response to discriminative policies such as the Bantu Education Act, which legitimized many parts of the Apartheid act, with its major provision being the racial separation of schools, as well as new requirements for African women to carry passes, and amendments to the Population Registration Act, which sought to reclassify 'Coloured' people. During the protest, a group of 2000 women of all races and some men attended the protest. The scale, and the multi-racial attendance of the protest helped FEDSAW rise to national prominence.

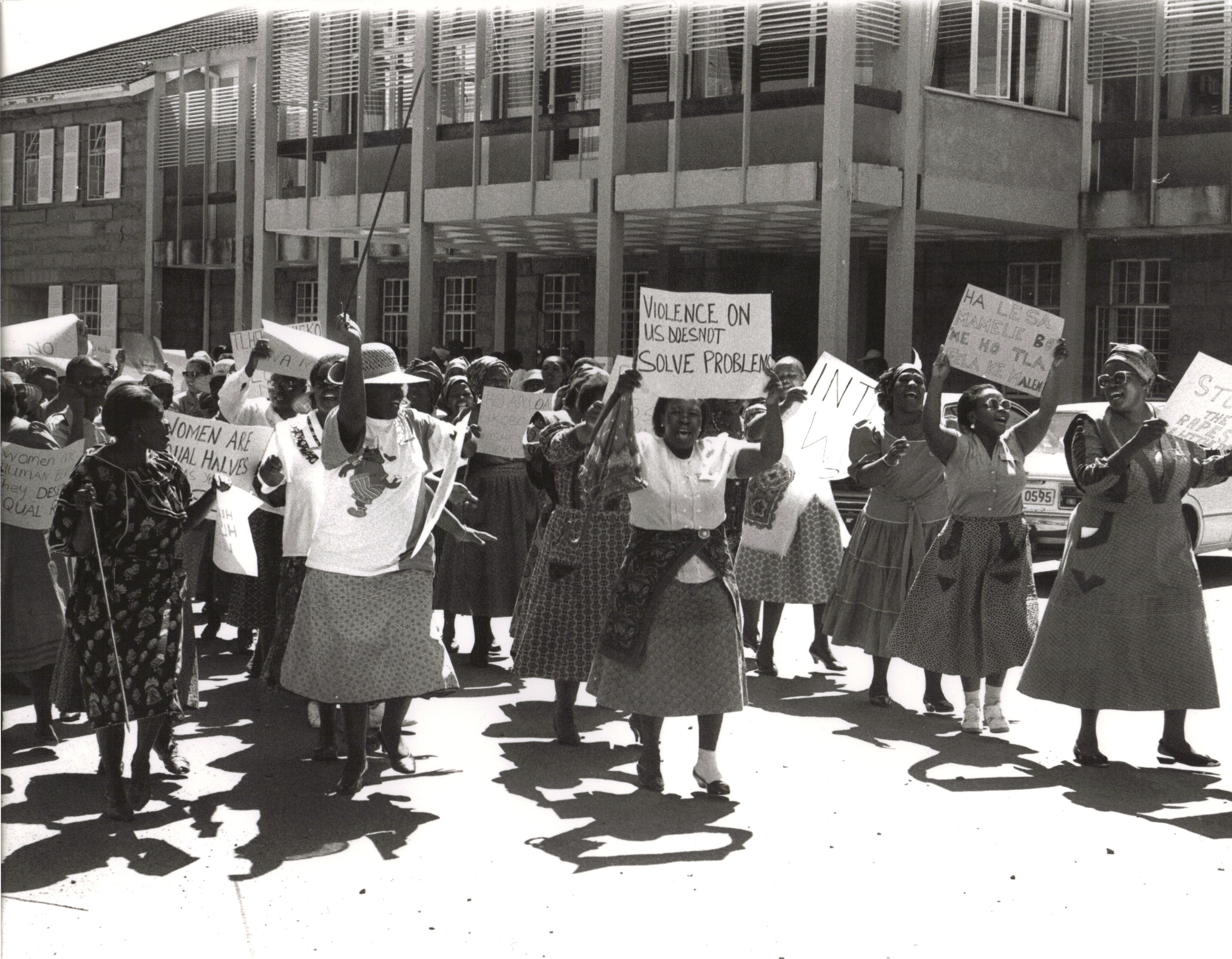
National Women's Day protest at the National University of Lesotho, where women protested violence against women.

=== Anti-Pass Protests, 1956-1958 ===
Between 1956 and 1958, a number of Anti-Pass protests were organized across South Africa. From January–July 1956, approximately 50,000 members attended 38 demonstrations. In particular, many were upset about the Native Laws Amendment Act, 1952 and Natives Act, 1956, which enforced Africans to carry paper documentation with them at all time and subjected many to forcible removal without appeal. During this time, FEDSAW coordinated the Women's March in August 1956. This has been considered to be the largest mass gathering of women in South African History to date as 20,000 women protested at the Pretoria Union buildings. For supporters of the apartheid system, the attendance of white people at these protests was especially unnerving.

Throughout 1957 and into 1958, the women's anti-pass campaign continued to generate wide scale support and attention from the international media. However, increasing pressures from the Apartheid state ultimately shut down the protests. Police violence also became increasingly violent. In November 1956, police opened fire on a crowd of 1000 people in Lichtenburg. Two Africans were killed and an additional two were injured. In 1960, after a day of demonstrations against the pass laws, a crowd of 7000 marched to the police station in the South African Township of Sharpeville. The South African police opened fire on the crowd, killing 69 and injuring 180; many were shot in the back as they fled, this was known as the Sharpeville Massacre.

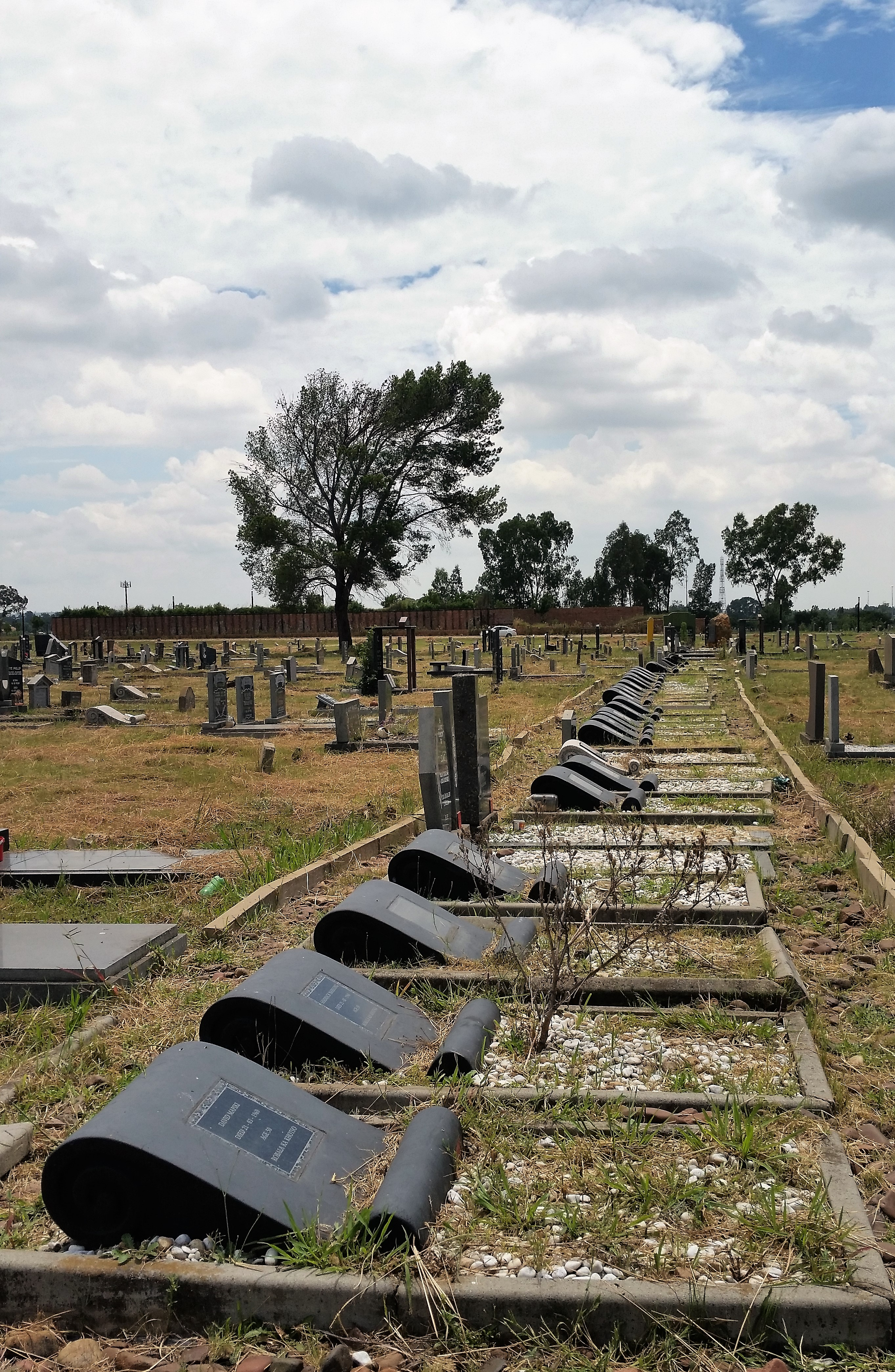
Sharpeville Massacre row of graves: 69 people were killed by police on March 21st, 1960, during an anti-pass protest at the Sharpeville Police Station.

=== Downfall/End of the Organization ===
Following the massacre, the apartheid state declared a national emergency and outlawed hundreds of activist groups. Amongst those banned was the ANC and the Congress Alliance. Although FEDSAW was allowed to continue operating, they were forced to continue their meetings in secret to avoid police surveillance, intimidation and harassment of its members. Furthermore, the arrest of several key leaders of FEDSAW made it extremely difficult to continue operations. A combination of government pressures and issues funding the organization made it impossible for FEDSAW to continue running. By the mid-1960s, FEDSAW had ceased to exist.

== Ideology ==
FEDSAW's ideology was heavily influenced by the works of Hilda Watts Bernstein and Rachel Simons, who argued that women's struggles for emancipation were necessary as part of a wider struggle for liberation in the struggle for a socialist state. There are also parallels in their Charter and objectives with the Communist Party objectives.

FEDSAW oriented itself from the beginning towards the policies of the Congress alliance and participated in the national liberation movement. It was committed to the liberation of the black majority in South Africa from white minority rule, by a process of peaceful change. White South African women generally abstained from participating in FEDSAW activism, with the exception of those in the Congress of Democrats.

=== Women's Charter ===
FEDSAW's Charter was drafted at the inaugural conference in 1954. It states the names of the new organization. The Charter asserted that an "intimate relationship" existed between women's inferior status in society and the inferior status assigned to people by "discriminatory laws and colour prejudices". It made clear that the struggle to emancipate women from discriminatory laws and conventions should be an intrinsic part of any general liberatory struggle.

=== Objectives ===
In addition to their official Charter, FEDSAW adopted eight specific aims at the 1954 inaugural conference:

1. "The right to vote and to be elected to all state bodies, without restriction or discrimination (i.e. universal suffrage)
2. "The right to full opportunities for employment with equal pay and possibilities of promotion in all spheres of work
3. "Equal rights with men in relation to property, marriage and children, and for the removal of all laws and customs that deny women such equal rights
4. "For the development of every child through free compulsory education for all; for the protection of mother and child through maternity homes, welfare clinics, creches and nursery schools, in countryside and towns; through proper homes for all, and through the provision of water, light, transport, sanitation and the amenities of modern civilization
5. "For the removal of all laws that restrict free movement, that prevent or hinder the right of free association, and activity in democratic organizations, and the right to participate in the work of these organizations
6. "To build and strengthen women's sections in the National Liberation Movements, the organization of women in the trade unions, and through the people's varied organizations
7. "To cooperate with all other organizations that have similar aims in South Africa and throughout the world
8. "To strive for permanent peace throughout the world"

== Membership ==
FEDSAW was made up of members from the ANC Women's League, The Congress of Democrats, the South African Indian Congress and the Coloured Women's Organization. While individual membership was not permitted, being a member of one of these organizations meant automatic membership in FEDSAW.

FEDSAW was composed of over 130 delegates from various local, national, and foreign organizations:

Name of Organization	Location
African Food and Canning Workers Union, Paarl	Cape Town, South Africa
African Food and Canning Workers Union, Worcester	Cape Town, South Africa
African National Congress Women's League	Cradock, South Africa; Durban, South Africa; Johannesburg, South Africa; Kimberlay, South Africa; Port Elizabeth, South Africa
African National Congress Women's League, Retreat Women's Vigilance Association	Cape Town, South Africa
African National Congress Women's League, Langa Women's Vigilance Association	Cape Town, South Africa
African National Congress Women's League, Nyanga Women's Vigilance Association	Cape Town, South Africa
African Women's Association	Durban, South Africa
Congress of Democrats	Cape Town, South Africa; Johannesburg, South Africa
Cape Factory Workers Committee	Cape Town, South Africa
Cape Housewives' League	Cape Town, South Africa
Food and Canning Workers Union	Cape Town, South Africa; East London, United Kingdom
Garment Workers' Union, No. 2	Johannesburg, South Africa
Guardian Christmas Club	Cape Town, South Africa
South African Coloured People's Organization	Cape Town, South Africa
South African Indian Congress	Durban, South Africa; Johannesburg, South Africa
Transvaal All-Women's Union	Johannesburg, South Africa

=== Notables ===
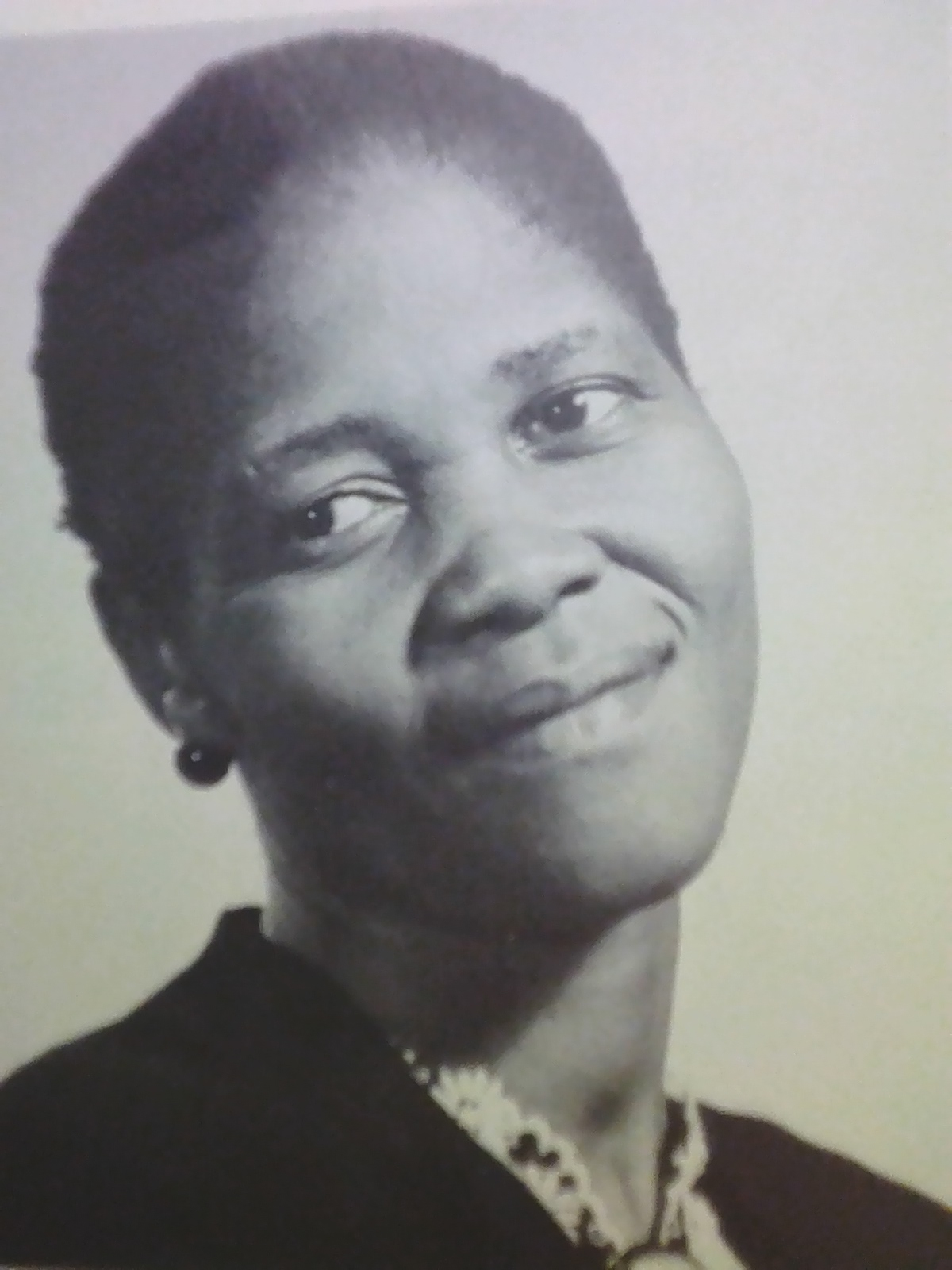
Photograph of young Lilian Ngoyi.

Ray Alexander

Florence Matomela

Frances Baard

Helen Joseph

Lilian Ngoyi

Hilda Watts Bernstein

Lilian Diedericks

=== Persecution of Leaders ===
In 1956, the top leadership of the Congress Alliance were arrested and prosecuted in the mammoth Treason trial. Amongst them were Helen Joseph and Lilian Ngoyi National, Secretary and President of FEDSAW at the time. The two were acquitted and had their charges withdrawn in 1961.

Additionally, the government banned founding member, Hilda Bernstein from having membership of many organisations in 1953. This ban was also extended to writing and publishing, limiting Bernstein's ability to participate in politics. In 1960, following the Sharpeville massacre, she was detained under the State of Emergency without charge. This resulted in exile for Hilda Watts Bernstein, but she continued to be a member of the ANC External Mission and an active speaker for the Anti-Apartheid Movement in Britain.

== Legacy ==
Between March and August 1956, FEDSAW planned to host a mass protest at the Union Buildings in Pretoria, South Africa. Held on August 9, 1956, the protest mobilized "between 6,000 to 20,000 women" from all over the country, including places such as "Cape Town, Bloemfontein, and Port Elizabeth." Reported by the Cape Times as the "largest mass gathering of women in [South African] history", the demonstration led to the official annual commemoration of 'Women's Day' in South Africa, as August 9.

The song "Wathint' Abafazki, Wathint' Imbokotho", or "You Have Tampered With The Women, You Have Struck a Rock" was created and popularized by the 1956 protest. In 2016, a monument was also created to memorialize the Women's March Leaders.

In 1989, the United Women's Congress, The Federation of Transvaal, The Natal Organization of Women and the Port Elizabeth Women's organization revived FEDSAW. Although a much smaller organization by this time, they continued to organize conferences and protests regarding women's issues, including sexual violence and homelessness. In addition, they "made a contribution towards training women in leadership".

== See also ==
- 1956 Treason Trial
- African National Congress Women's League
- Congress Alliance
- South African Indian Congress
- Frances Baard
- Helen Joseph
- Fatima Meer
- Amma Naidoo
- Lillian Ngoyi
- Rachel Simons
- Women's March 1956
- National Women's Day (South Africa)
- Sharpeville Massacre
- Apartheid
- Jean Bernadt
