= Red Location Museum =

Museum in South Africa

Coordinates: 33.898134°S 25.605708°E

The Red Location Museum
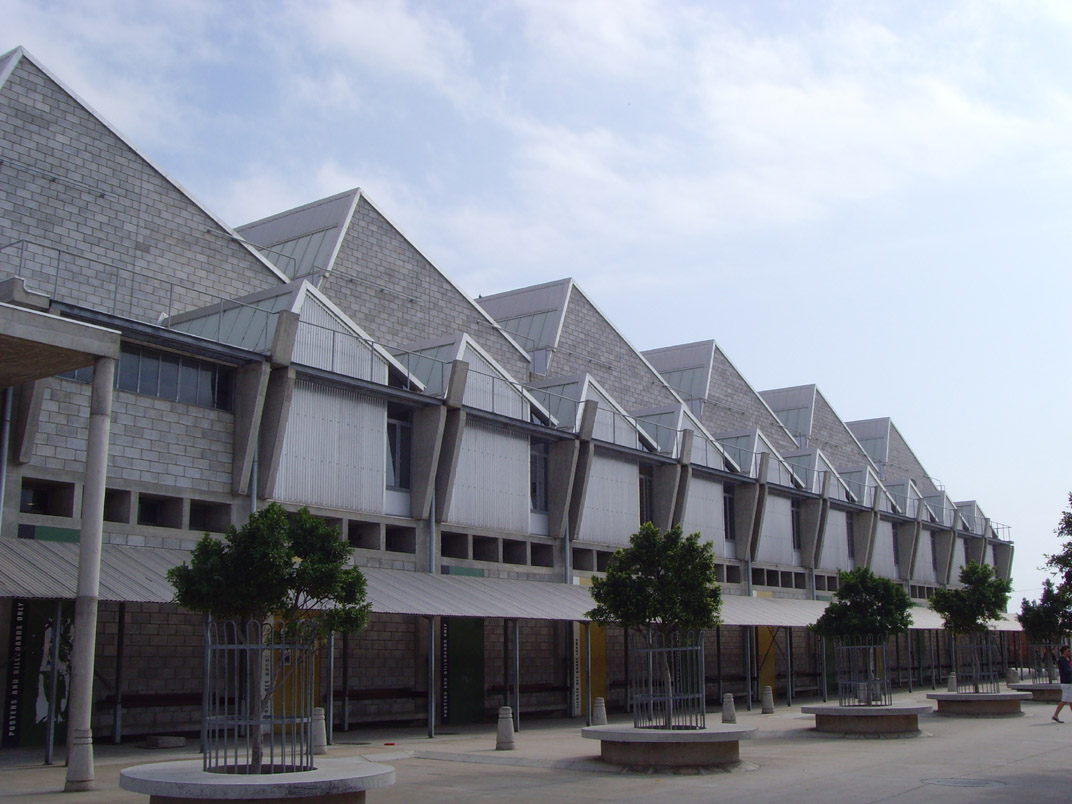
- Red Location Museum
- Location: Port Elizabeth, South Africa

The Red Location Museum is a museum in the New Brighton township of Port Elizabeth, South Africa.

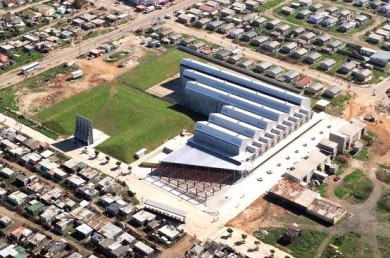
Red Location Museum Exterior

The museum was opened to the public on 10 November 2006 as a tribute to the struggle against Apartheid. It is situated in a shack settlement that is one of the oldest townships in Port Elizabeth.

The area once housed a Boer concentration camp, but the camp's residents were moved in 1900 when the site would become one of the first few urban settlements for Black people.

== Architecture ==
The building was designed by Cape Town-based architect Jo Noero of Noero Architects. The concept was inspired by the literary work of German-born professor Andreas Huyssen, whose work focuses on the idea of memory and history. It challenges the traditional notions of museum design. Instead of being treated as mere consumers of information, as in the case of conventional museums, visitors are encouraged to actively participate in the experience and navigate through it as they please with no set path.

Construction reportedly cost R22-million and the municipality was believed to be spending R300 000 a month on operating costs. Similar to the surrounding informal settlements, the museum is made of corrugated iron boxes (12 in total) that are 6 x 6 x 12 metres.

The museum houses an auditorium, library, art gallery, a memorial space honouring local heroes of the liberation struggle and offices. There were plans of erecting an adjoining tomb where struggle heroes Raymond Mhlaba and Govan Mbeki would be buried, but this was not seen to completion when the heroes’ families refused to have the bodies exhumed. The use of boxes was inspired by the boxes that migrant workers used to keep their treasured possessions when they were away from their families in rural areas.

== Awards ==
Over the years, Noero Wolff Architects collected numerous awards for their work on the museum. In 2005, the building won the World Leadership Award for Public Architecture in London at the World Leadership Forum. The Royal Institute of British Architects International Award and the Dedallo Minosse Presidents Award from Italy were added to its accolades in 2006. In 2010, it was named the Most Outstanding Building Outside the EU by the Royal Institute of British Architects when it received the Lubetkin Prize. It won the Icon Building of the Year Award from Icon in London in 2012.

== Public resistance ==
In October 2013, after protests from Red Location residents over housing issues, the museum, library and gallery were closed. It has remained closed since. The residents demanded that the government fix their poorly constructed homes which had been declared structurally unsound. After the museum's closure in 2013, the government and the community reached an agreement to demolish and correctly rebuild 288 houses. The work was not done. Nelson Mandela Bay human settlements political head Nqaba Bhanga argued that Human Settlements Minister at the time Lindiwe Sisulu had discontinued the rectification of the shoddy construction jobs. During violent protests windows were broken and other parts of the site were vandalised. Wiring, power sockets, fencing, air-conditioners and palisade fencing were also stolen from the premises. Repair costs for the building were estimated at R12-million but these have not begun. One of the museum's security guards was fatally shot in front of the building in December 2013.
