= Construction and Allied Workers' Union =

Trade union in South Africa

The Construction and Allied Workers' Union (CAWU) was a trade union representing building workers in South Africa.

The union was founded on 31 January 1987, when the Brick, Clay and Allied Workers' Union merged with relevant sections of six other unions:

- General and Allied Workers' Union
- General Workers' Union
- General Workers' Union of South Africa
- Metal and Allied Workers' Union
- South African Allied Workers' Union
- Transport and General Workers' Union

Like all its predecessors, the union affiliated to the Congress of South African Trade Unions. The union's first general secretary was Desmond Mahasha, and its first president was David Ngcobo. In later years, M. Oliphant became general secretary, and Fred Gona became president.

In 2001, the union merged into the National Union of Mineworkers.
