= Magwaza Maphalala =

South African politician and trade unionist (1948–2003)

Member of the National Assembly
- In office June 1999 – 5 February 2003
- Constituency: KwaZulu-Natal

Personal details
- Born: Magwaza Alfred Maphalala; 6 April 1948 Bergville, Natal Province; Union of South Africa
- Died: 5 February 2003 (aged 54) Cape Town, Western Cape; Republic of South Africa
- Party: African National Congress
- Other political affiliations: South African Communist Party
- Spouse: Nombuso Maphalala

Magwaza Alfred Maphalala (6 April 1948 – 5 February 2003) was a South African politician and trade unionist from KwaZulu-Natal. He represented the African National Congress (ANC) in the National Assembly from 1999 until his death in 2003. He was also a stalwart of the South African Communist Party (SACP) in KwaZulu-Natal.

Maphalala was active in the anti-apartheid movement in Durban as an underground member of the SACP and ANC. He served as general secretary of the National Federation of Workers (NFW) from 1983, and from 1986 to 1990, he worked in exile at the headquarters of the South African Congress of Trade Unions (SACTU). He was provincial secretary of the SACP in KwaZulu-Natal from 1995 to 1998 and then served on the party's provincial executive committee from 1998 until his death.

== Early life ==
Maphalala was born on 6 April 1948 in Bergville in the former Natal Province. An only child, he completed high school in Bergville before moving to Durban to find work.

== Union activism ==
He joined the trade union movement in the aftermath of the 1973 Durban strikes, and during the same period he was recruited into the underground of the ANC and SACP, which at the time were illegal anti-apartheid organisations. He was active in the Transport and General Workers' Union and in 1980 he was recruited into the underground of the illegal ANC-allied SACTU by Sam Kikine of the South African Allied Workers' Union. In his SACTU work, he reported to Moses Mabhida, who was exiled abroad, and he represented SACTU at the International Labour Organisation and other international forums.

Maphalala was elected general secretary of the NFW in 1983. Under Maphalala's leadership, the NFW was involved in the union unity talks that led to the formation of the Congress of South African Trade Unions (COSATU), which absorbed the NFW. In September 1985, shortly before COSATU's launch, Maphalala was arrested in Durban for his political activities, and he was detained without trial for a year. Upon his release, he and his family went into exile in Lusaka, Zambia, where he worked for SACTU's headquarters. During this period, he also attended a trade union leadership course in Moscow, before returning to become SACTU's administrative secretary, a position he held from 1987 until SACTU was disbanded.

In 1990, the apartheid government unbanned the ANC, the SACP, and other black organisations, and Maphalala returned to South Africa. He worked as a union education officer, first in the Post and Telecommunications Workers' Association from and then, from 1993, in COSATU's Natal regional branch.

== Post-apartheid political career ==
Over the next decade, Maphalala rose through the ranks of the Tripartite Alliance. He was elected regional secretary of the SACP's Southern Natal branch in 1994 and then served as SACP provincial secretary in KwaZulu-Natal from 1995 to 1998. While holding that office, in 1997, he was elected as provincial secretary of the National Education, Health and Allied Workers' Union in KwaZulu-Natal. He was also an organiser for the ANC and was appointed to lead the party's campaign in the 1995 local government elections.

At the SACP's provincial congress in 1998, Maphalala was elected as a member of the SACP's provincial executive committee, receiving the most votes of any candidate. He remained a member of the committee until his death. In the 1999 general election, he was elected to ANC seat in the KwaZulu-Natal caucus of the National Assembly, where he served until his death.

== Personal life and death ==
Maphalala was married to Nombuso Maphalala and had five children. He died on 5 February 2003 in Cape Town after a short illness.

In 2008, the eThekwini Metropolitan Municipality renamed Durban's Gale Street in Maphalala's honour. A regional branch of the SACP in southern eThekwini is also named after him.
