= Samson Ndou =

South African politician and trade unionist (born 1939)

Samson Ndou OLS

Member of the National Assembly
- In office until 9 June 2006

Personal details
- Born: Ratshivhanda Samson Ndou; 28 December 1939 (age 85)
- Citizenship: South Africa
- Political party: African National Congress

Ratshivhanda Samson Ndou (born 28 December 1939) is a South African politician and former trade unionist. During apartheid, he was a prominent member of a network of Charterist union organisers in the Transvaal, as well as a founding member of the United Democratic Front (UDF) and president of the General and Allied Workers' Union (GAWU).

After the end of apartheid, he represented the African National Congress (ANC) in the National Assembly, in the Limpopo Provincial Legislature, and in the Vhembe District Council.

== Early life and activism ==
Ndou was born on 28 December 1939. He joined the African National Congress (ANC) at an early stage of the anti-apartheid struggle and he remained active in its underground after it was banned by the government in 1960. He was part of an underground network of labour activists in the Transvaal – also including Rita Ndzanga, Sydney Mufamadi, and others – who were associated with the South African Congress of Trade Unions (SACTU), which was allied to the ANC but had itself been banned in 1962.

=== Communism trial ===
Ndou was arrested in May 1969 and detained without trial for several months before being charged with violations of the Suppression of Communism Act. In State v Samson Ndou and 21 Others, the state alleged that Ndou and various other ANC and SACTU supporters – among them Rita Ndzanga and Winnie Mandela – had in various ways sought to further the aims of the illegal ANC, including through conspiracy to commit sabotage in Johannesburg. All 22 defendants were acquitted and the trial was regarded as a political failure for the apartheid state, because it had revealed publicly that, despite the intense political repression of the decade, ANC supporters continued to mobilise underground.

Decades later, Ndou testified to the Truth and Reconciliation Commission that he had been severely tortured by the Security Branch during his detention in 1969, as well as during a later detention in the summer of 1981. He and the other 21 triallists were awarded the Order of Luthuli in Silver in 2017 for "their brave fight against apartheid".

=== United Democratic Front ===
Upon his release, Ndou resumed his underground work, at the time focused primarily on recruitment activities and political education, such as through proliferation of the illegal Freedom Charter. He and other SACTU loyalists became increasingly involved in the Black Allied Workers' Union (BAWU), and Samson himself remained in contact with SACTU's exiled leadership abroad. However, when Rita Ndzanga broke away from BAWU in 1980, Ndou joined her in the new General and Allied Workers' Union (GAWU). He was later president of GAWU.

In 1983, Ndou made a speech at the Cape Town launch of the United Democratic Front (UDF), a new popular front against apartheid. He was also elected to the executive committee of the Transvaal Indian Congress after the congress was relaunched in the same year (though he was not himself Indian). In the mid-1980s, he became increasingly involved in running the UDF's national office as many of the front's national leaders were detained. During the same period, he was a key figure in organising the union unity talks that resulted in the formation of the Congress of South African Trade Unions in 1985.

== Career in government ==
=== Parliament ===
In South Africa's first post-apartheid elections in 1994, Ndou was not immediately elected to the National Assembly, but he joined during the legislative term, filling a casual vacancy in the aNC caucus. He was re-elected to full terms in the assembly in 1999 and 2004. He served in his seat until 9 June 2006, when he resigned. During this period, ahead of the 2000 local elections, Ndou stood briefly as the ANC's mayoral candidate for Thohoyandou, Limpopo; however, it soon transpired that he had registered to vote in another city (Cape Town) and therefore was ineligible to stand.

=== Provincial legislature ===
After leaving Parliament, Ndou represented the ANC in the Limpopo Provincial Legislature, where he served as a Member of the Executive Council (MEC) for Safety and Security under Premier Sello Moloto. In late 2008, when Mosiuoa Lekota and Sam Shilowa announced their intention to break away from the ANC and form a new party, the Mail & Guardian reported that Ndou was among those who had shown an interest in the new initiative. However, Ndou remained with the ANC and continued in the safety and security portfolio until the 2009 general election, after which he left the legislature.

=== Local government ===
In the 2016 local elections, Ndou was elected to represent the ANC as a local councillor in the Vhembe District Municipality. He was also appointed as chief whip in the council, serving under mayor Florence Radzilani.

In 2021, the ANC's Provincial Executive Committee in Limpopo appointed Ndou as a member of the party's seven-member provincial Integrity Commission.
