= Joe Foster (trade unionist) =

Joseph Alexander Foster (born 17 October 1938) is a South African former trade union leader.

Born in East London, Foster was educated at the John Bisseker High School and the University of Fort Hare. He married Joan Stride in 1960 and took a succession of short-term jobs, then in 1961 moved to Kraaifontein and worked for an ink manufacturing company. In 1972, he was appointed as secretary of the Western Province Motor Assembly Workers' Union, an affiliate of the Trade Union Council of South Africa (TUCSA). He proved successful, championing workers' control and opposition to apartheid.

Foster established an increasingly high profile through his involvement in the International Metalworkers' Federation's co-ordinating council in South Africa. In 1976, he disaffiliated the union from TUCSA, which was proving increasingly unpopular with members. He found like-minded union officials were setting up the Federation of South African Trade Unions (FOSATU) and persuaded the union to affiliate. In 1980, he took his union into a merger which formed the National Automobile and Allied Workers' Union (NAAWU), becoming a regional secretary.

Foster was elected as general secretary of FOSATU in 1982. He gave a major speech in which he described the federation's role as building a working-class organisation to represent workers politically. The South African Communist Party objected to this, which it saw as usurping its role as a vanguard party.

Foster supported the principle of South African trade unions being represented by a single federation. In late 1985, FOSATU merged into the new Congress of South African Trade Unions, but Foster was not elected to a post in the new federation. He returned to his regional secretary post at NAAWU, then when the union merged into the new National Union of Metalworkers of South Africa, he held the same post there. In 1992, he was appointed as the union's national organiser with responsibility for staff development.

Trade union offices
Preceded by Alec Erwin	General Secretary of the Federation of South African Trade Unions; 1982–1985	Succeeded by Federation merged
