= Mbhazima Shilowa =

South African politician and trade unionist (born 1958)

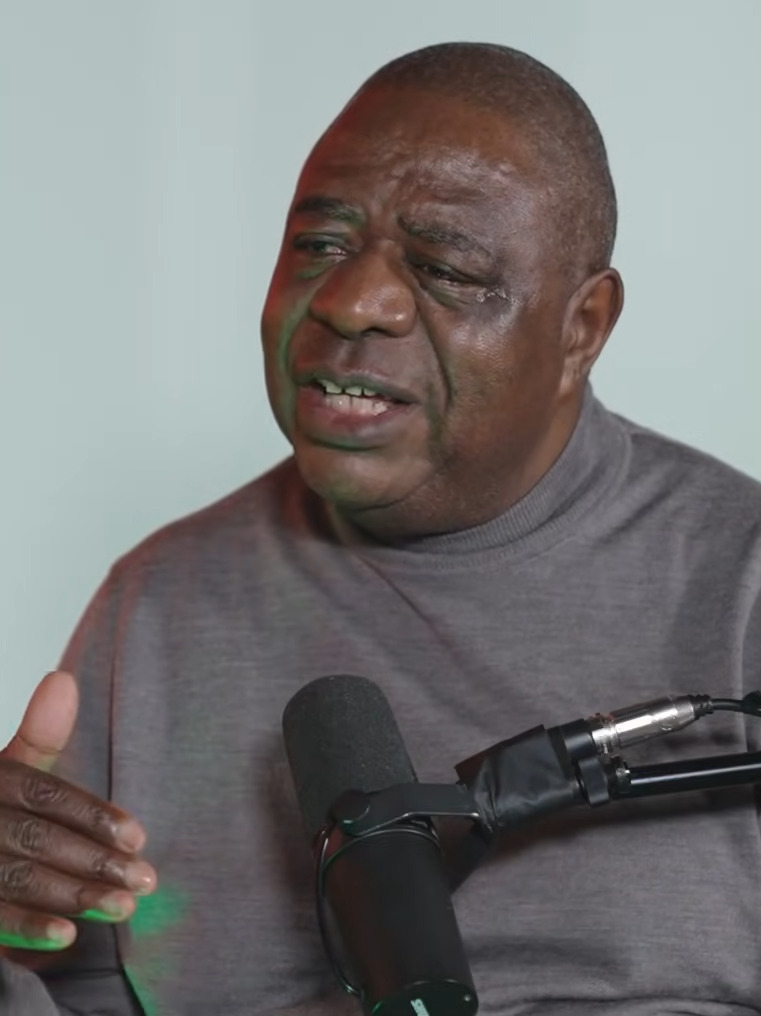
- Shilowa in 2025

Member of the National Assembly
- In office 6 May 2009 – 9 February 2011

3rd Premier of Gauteng
- In office 15 June 1999 – 29 September 2008
- Preceded by: Mathole Motshekga
- Succeeded by: Paul Mashatile

General Secretary of the Congress of South African Trade Unions
- In office September 1993 – June 1999
- Deputy: Zwelinzima Vavi
- Preceded by: Jay Naidoo
- Succeeded by: Zwelinzima Vavi
Party offices 2001–2011
Deputy President of the Congress of the People
In office 16 December 2008 – 8 February 2011 Serving with Lynda Odendaal
President	Mosiuoa Lekota
Preceded by	Party established
Succeeded by	Willie Madisha
Provincial Chairperson of the Gauteng African National Congress
In office November 2001 – October 2007
Deputy	Angie Motshekga
Preceded by	Mathole Motshekga
Succeeded by	Paul Mashatile

Personal details
- Born: Mbhazima Samuel Shilowa; 30 April 1958 (age 68) Olifantshoek, Northern Province; Union of South Africa
- Party: Congress of the People (2008–2014); African National Congress (1990–2008)
- Other political affiliations: South African Communist Party
- Spouse: Wendy Luhabe
- Nickname: Sam

Mbhazima Samuel Shilowa (born 30 April 1958) is a retired South African politician and former trade unionist. He was the third Premier of Gauteng between 1999 and 2008. He was formerly the general secretary of the Congress of South African Trade Unions (Cosatu) between 1993 and 1999, and he later became a co-founder of the Congress of the People (Cope).

Born in the rural Northern Province, Shilowa became active in the trade union movement as a shop steward in Johannesburg in 1981. He rose through the ranks of the Transport and General Workers' Union before becoming Cosatu's deputy general secretary in 1991 and its general secretary in 1993. During this period he was also active in anti-apartheid politics, including as a member of Cosatu's Tripartite Alliance partners: he joined the Central Committee of the South African Communist Party in 1991 and joined the National Executive Committee of the African National Congress (ANC) in 1994.

After the June 1999 general election, Shilowa resigned as Cosatu general secretary to represent the ANC as Premier of Gauteng. The flagship policies of his administration included the construction of the Gautrain. Although he was re-elected to a second term as premier in the April 2004 general election, he resigned from the office on 29 September 2008; a political ally and personal friend of Thabo Mbeki, he resigned in protest of the ANC's decision to recall Mbeki from the national presidency.

In October 2008, he resigned his ANC membership to co-found an ANC breakaway party, COPE, with Mosiuoa Lekota. He became COPE's inaugural deputy president and, after the April 2009 general election, its chief whip in the National Assembly of South Africa. However, within 18 months, COPE was divided by an ongoing leadership contest between Lekota and Shilowa, who claimed to have been elected as COPE's new president by an abortive party conference in December 2010. The Lekota-led faction expelled Shilowa from the party in February 2011.

== Early life and career ==
Shilowa was born on 30 April 1958 at Olifantshoek, a village in the former Northern Province (now Limpopo). He was the youngest of seven children and one of only three who survived past infancy. After taking several years off school because of his family's poverty, Shilowa attended Akani High School in Hlanganani, but in 1978, he dropped out at standard nine after an altercation with one of his teachers. In 1979 he moved to Johannesburg to find employment; living in the township of Dobsonville, he worked at a hardware store in Germiston, did clerical and laboratory work at Anglo-Alpha Cement in Roodepoort, and then worked as a trainer for PSG Services in the city.

== Early trade union activism ==
Shilowa became involved in the trade union movement in 1981 when he was elected as shop steward at his workplace at Anglo-Alpha Cement; he later held the same position at PSG Services. Over the next decade, he rose rapidly in the movement's ranks, becoming deputy chairperson of the Witwatersrand hub of the Congress of South African Trade Unions (Cosatu). In 1991 he was elected as Cosatu's deputy general secretary, deputising general secretary Jay Naidoo. He also served as vice-president and then briefly as president of the Transport and General Workers' Union, a founding affiliate of Cosatu.

Meanwhile, through Cosatu, Shilowa was active in the anti-apartheid movement's Mass Democratic Movement. After the African National Congress (ANC) and South African Communist Party (SACP) were unbanned in 1990, he was elected to the interim leadership corps that oversaw the parties' organisational revival in Gauteng. In 1991 he was elected to the Central Committee of the SACP for the first time. The following year, during the negotiations to end apartheid, he was a member of the ANC's negotiating team at the Convention for a Democratic South Africa (CODESA), and he was later a delegate to the Multi-Party Negotiating Forum.

== Cosatu general secretary: 1993–1999 ==
Shilowa was elected to succeed Naidoo as Cosatu general secretary at a special union congress in 1993, and he held that position for the next six years, gaining re-election in 1994 and 1997. According to Mark Gevisser, he attained the position largely due to his prominence in the Gauteng structures of the SACP.

Under Shilowa, Cosatu became a key campaigning vehicle for the ANC ahead of the first post-apartheid elections in April 1994, under the auspices of the Tripartite Alliance, and its close relationship to the party persisted when the party entered government. Shilowa was closely involved in the establishment of the National Economic Development and Labour Council (Nedlac). He was also a close personal friend and informal adviser to Deputy President Thabo Mbeki, and, writing in 1996, Gevisser argued that his political talent and political experience were among his greatest strengths as Cosatu leader, though they also made him an object of some suspicion among hardline unionists. He was viewed as "uncomfortable with Cosatu's hardline anti-privatisation position".

During his tenure as Cosatu general secretary, Shilowa was twice a member of the National Executive Committee of the ANC. He was first elected to the organ at the ANC's 49th National Conference in December 1994, though he resigned before the committee completed its three-year term. At the party's next elective conference, the 50th National Conference in Mafikeng in December 1997, he was elected to return to a five-year term on the committee, which he served in full. Controversially, the committee appointed Shilowa to serve on an internal task team charged with investigating the actions of the SACP's left wing during the ANC's 50th Conference.

== Premier of Gauteng: 1999–2008 ==
On 23 April 1999, the ANC announced that Shilowa would stand in the upcoming general election as the party's candidate for election as Premier of Gauteng. The announcement followed prolonged speculation that Shilowa would leave the trade union movement for a senior government position, though he had been expected to join the national cabinet as Minister of Labour. His premiership campaign also marked his personal rebranding as Mbhazima Shilowa; formerly known in the trade union movement as Sam, he said that he had never liked his Christian name.

He resigned as COSATU secretary-general soon after the 2 June election, when it became clear that the ANC had won a comfortable majority in the Gauteng Provincial Legislature, and he was formally elected as premier, unopposed, on 15 June 1999. He was re-elected to a second term as premier after the April 2004 general election.

=== Policy platforms ===
One of Shilowa's first acts as premier in 1999 was a slate of controversial appointments to the Gauteng Executive Council; his critics accused him of fuelling factionalism in the provincial ANC by sidelining supporters of his predecessor, Mathole Motshekga, and by appointing Motshekga's rival Amos Masondo as his political adviser. However, over the next nine years, he generally suppressed factional conflict in the provincial party. He became a moderately popular premier; at the conclusion of his term, the opposition Democratic Alliance complimented his economic policies, but critics accused him of failing to combat corruption and service delivery failures.

The best-known initiative of his administration was the Gautrain express rail system, long nicknamed the Shilowa Express, which he announced during his first term as premier. After significant delays, a construction contract for the railway was signed in 2006. Shilowa's administration was also an early adopter of a progressive HIV/AIDS policy; his government announced the rollout of a mother-to-child transmission prevention programme in 2001 and the general rollout of an anti-retroviral treatment programme in 2004, while the policies were still unpopular in the national government.

=== ANC chairmanship ===
At a party elective conference in November 2001, Shilowa was elected unopposed as provincial chairperson of the Gauteng ANC. He succeeded former premier Motshekga, whose leadership corps had been disbanded in 2000, and he was viewed as the preferred candidate of the incumbent national leadership of the party. At the same elective conference, David Makhura was elected provincial secretary and Angie Motshekga was elected as deputy provincial chairperson. Shilowa and the others served two terms in the party leadership, gaining re-election comfortably in December 2004.

At the conclusion of his second term as provincial chairperson in October 2007, Shilowa declined a nomination to stand for a third; instead, he reportedly supported Paul Mashatile's successful bid to succeed him. The elective conference elected Shilowa as an ordinary member of the ANC's Provincial Executive Committee.

=== Polokwane conference ===
Ahead of the ANC's 52nd National Conference in 2007, as Mbeki approached the end of his second term as ANC president and national president, Shilowa was reportedly a key backer of the resistance against Jacob Zuma's presidential campaign. The Mail & Guardian reported that he might himself stand for the deputy presidency on an anti-Zuma slate led by Tokyo Sexwale. After Sexwale's campaign failed, he supported Mbeki's bid for election to a third term. However, when the conference was held in Polokwane in December 2007, Zuma won the presidency.

In the aftermath of Mbeki's defeat, Shilowa himself withdrew from contention for election to the ANC's National Executive Committee. He initially told press that if he was not elected "I won't feel disheartened. At least I took a stand." However, shortly before the vote, he withdrew his candidacy, explaining, "I decided that this is an NEC that I don't want to be part of."

=== Resignation ===
As the Zuma-led ANC moved against Mbeki in 2008, Shilowa was among those who defended Mbeki publicly; in September 2008, he warned that it would be ill-advised to impeach Mbeki because, "There may be people who'll say we might as well leave with him." Nonetheless, on 29 September 2008, under pressure from the ANC leadership, Mbeki resigned from the national presidency. Later the same day, Shilowa announced his own resignation as Premier of Gauteng in protest of the party's treatment of Mbeki. He explained:

I am resigning due to my convictions that while the African National Congress has the right to recall any of its deployed cadres, the decision needs to be based on solid facts, be fair and just. I also did not feel that I will be able to, with conviction, publicly explain or defend the national executive committee’s decision on comrade Thabo Mbeki... It is a known fact that I hold strong views on the manner of his dismissal, and to pretend otherwise would be disingenuous. I acknowledge and respect the ANC’s rights to recall any of its deployed cadres. I am, however, of the view that there was no cogent reason for doing so.

He later said that Mbeki's ouster had been "the straw that broke the camel's back", compounding his pre-existing concerns about the contemporary ANC's approach to "honesty, integrity, solidarity, humaneness and the rule of law". Mashatile was elected to succeed him as premier.

Meanwhile, Shilowa was immediately linked to a rumored breakaway initiative in the ANC, associated with national minister Mosiuoa Lekota. On 15 October 2008, he held a press conference in Johannesburg at which he announced that he had resigned from the ANC to work full-time as the "convenor and volunteer-in-chief" of Lekota's initiative. He later said that he had approached Lekota after hearing him criticize the ANC in a radio interview. While COSATU condemned his decision, ANC spokeswoman Jessie Duarte said, "We knew he was going to do that."

== Congress of the People: 2008–2014 ==
=== Establishment ===
In the remainder of 2008, Shilowa and Lekota, known to the press by the portmanteau Shikota, spearheaded the launch of a new political party peopled by Mbeki's supporters in the ANC. Shilowa formally announced their plans to establish a political party on 1 November 2008, at a national convention in Sandton, and the following week he announced that the party would be registered as the Congress of the People (COPE).

Though he was named as the party's interim deputy chairperson, Shilowa quickly eclipsed Lekota and Mluleki George as the face of the new party, leading to rumors that he might become its leader. However, when COPE held its inaugural national congress in Bloemfontein in December 2008, the leadership was elected by "consensus" rather than vote, and Shilowa became the party's deputy president, under Lekota as party president. He was officially the party's first deputy president, with businesswoman Lynda Odendaal named as second deputy president.

=== 2009 general election ===
COPE contested the April 2009 general election with Mvume Dandala as its presidential candidate. Although Shilowa denied rumors that he and Lekota competed bitterly for the presidential candidate slot, the Mail & Guardian reported that his supporters were key in driving the eventual selection of Dandala over Lekota. Pursuant to the election, Lekota was elected to a seat in the National Assembly, the lower house of the South African Parliament, and he was named as the party's chief whip. He said that COPE would seek to become a "patriotic opposition party that would raise issues with the ruling party in a mature and fair manner".

=== Factionalism and exit ===
During its first year in Parliament, COPE was severely undermined by factional leadership battles, as Shilowa's supporters campaigned for him to replace Lekota as COPE president. Internal divisions were visible by the end of 2009, and the party's national congress in Centurion in May 2010 collapsed after Shilowa-aligned delegates purported to pass a motion of no-confidence in Lekota. In October 2010, Lekota's camp resolved to suspend Shilowa from his position as COPE chief whip and accounting officer, alleging that he had been implicated in financial mismanagement. However, his suspension was declared invalid by the Western Cape High Court, which said that he had unlawfully been denied the right to respond to the charges against him. After the court ruling, Lekota denied that Shilowa had been removed at all, saying that he had merely been relieved of his financial responsibilities.

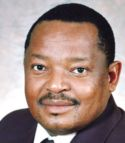
Mosiuoa Lekota, Shilowa's partner and rival in COPE

In December 2010, another COPE national congress devolved into chaos; Shilowa declared that the congress had elected him to succeed Lekota as party president, but Lekota strongly disagreed. Over the next few months, both Lekota and Shilowa claimed simultaneously to lead COPE. In January 2011, Lekota's camp purported to suspend Shilowa, and several of his closest allies, from membership in COPE. Shilowa was subsequently subjected to an internal disciplinary hearing, which concluded in February 2011 with his putative expulsion from the party; the disciplinary panel – constituted by Lekota's supporters – found that he had seriously mismanaged the finances of COPE's parliamentary caucus. Shilowa, who had refused to participate in the disciplinary process, denied the allegations.

Pursuant to the putative expulsion, Lekota's faction notified the Speaker of the National Assembly that Shilowa was no longer authorized to represent the party in Parliament, but Speaker Max Sisulu did not accept the notification, saying that he could not adjudicate COPE's internal leadership controversies. Later the same week, Lekota obtained an interim court order interdicting Shilowa from attending Parliament or claiming to lead COPE while a court heard a pending lawsuit between the two factions. In the interim, Shilowa and his supporters boycotted COPE's campaign in the May 2011 local elections. The lawsuit finally concluded in October 2013, when the Johannesburg High Court upheld Lekota's claim to the COPE leadership, ruling that the December 2010 congress had been inquorate and therefore was incompetent to elect Shilowa as president.

In January 2014, COPE held its next national congress, defeating another lawsuit by Shilowa supporters who sought to interdict the congress; Willie Madisha was elected to replace Shilowa as Lekota's deputy. Ahead of the May 2014 general election, Shilowa announced publicly that he would support the campaign of the United Democratic Movement (UDM), another ANC breakaway party, though he did not himself officially join the UDM.

== Retirement and personal life ==
After losing the battle to lead COPE, Shilowa retreated from active politics, though he remains prominent as a political commentator and News24 columnist. In 2024 he described himself as "a man of leisure". He also has a wine company, Epicurean, which he founded in 2003 with businessmen Mutle Mogase, Moss Ngoasheng, and Ron Gault; the company specializes in red wines, which it produces at Johann Rupert's Rupert & Rothschild cellars in Paarl.

He is married to businesswoman Wendy Luhabe, who was one of COPE's early financiers and fundraisers. In addition to his children with Luhabe, Shilowa reportedly has two sons from a former customary marriage to Caroline Rikhotso; the youngest sued successfully for child support in 2007.

Political offices
Preceded by Mathole Motshekga	Premier of Gauteng; 15 June 1999 – 29 September 2008	Succeeded by Paul Mashatile
