= Salie Manie =

South African politician and trade unionist (born 1949)

Member of the National Assembly
- In office 9 May 1994 – 1 March 2007

Personal details
- Born: Moegammad Salie Manie; 21 February 1949 (age 77) District Six, Cape Town; Cape Province, Union of South Africa
- Citizenship: South Africa
- Party: African National Congress

Moegammad Saliegh Manie (born 21 February 1949) is a retired South African politician and former trade unionist. He rose to political prominence during the 1980s as a leading figure in the Cape Town Municipal Workers' Association and South African Municipal Workers' Union. Later he represented the African National Congress (ANC) in the National Assembly from 1994 until his resignation in 2007.

== Early life and career ==
Manie was born on 21 February 1949 in Cape Town's District Six. He was the eldest of six children and his family survived mainly on a government grant after his father suffered a serious accident and was unable to work. He was significantly influenced by his mother, who was a religious instructor at the local mosque; in 1992, he described himself as both a Muslim and a socialist.

After finishing high school, Manie began work as an accounts clerk and then as a radio and television technician. He later opened his own repair shop. He sold the shop after eight years, planning to begin an undergraduate degree, but while waiting to enroll he took up work at the Cape Town City Council.

== Union career ==
Within six months of beginning work at the council, Manie was elected as a shop steward for the Cape Town Municipal Workers' Association (CTMWA), which during this period – the 1980s – was renowned for his militant opposition to apartheid. Six months later, Manie was elected vice president of CTMWA.

When the union merged with others to create the South African Municipal Workers' Union (SAMWU), he became an influential member of the new formation. He also served on the economic and development task force of the Congress of South African Trade Unions, in which capacity he was involved in devising the Reconstruction and Development Programme, and he was vice-chairperson of the local government negotiating forum during the democratic transition.

== Legislative career ==
In South Africa's first post-apartheid elections in 1994, Manie was elected to represent the ANC in the National Assembly, the lower house of the new South African Parliament. During the legislative term that followed, he chaired Parliament's committee on public service and administration. He also manned one of the ANC's constituency offices in Cape Town, with a constituency covering Bo-Kaap and the City Bowl.

At an early stage of the term, in September 1994, Manie was viewed as a frontrunner to succeed Allan Boesak as provincial chairperson of the ANC's Western Cape branch. Amid intense competition between Boesak, Tony Yengeni, and Chris Nissen, Manie told the press that he was "not prepared to be part of a dogfight", but he was viewed as a possible compromise candidate because of his union background. When the party elective conference was held, Boesak bowed out and Nissen defeated Manie and Yengeni to win the position.

During his second term in Parliament, which began in 1999, Manie chaired the Portfolio Committee on Labour. He remained in that position after the 2004 general election. However, midway through the legislative term, on 1 March 2007, he resigned from his seat in the National Assembly.

== Personal life ==
Manie is married to Rugaya Manie and has three children: Carnita Manie (born 1974), Riaan Manie (1977-2002), and Thania Manie (born 1980).

He has three grandchildren: Kai Manie (born 2006), Saliegh Waggie (born 2011), and Mishkah Waggie (born 2017).
