= Alec Erwin =

South African politician

Alexander Erwin

Minister of Public Enterprises
- In office 29 April 2004 – September 2008
- President: Thabo Mbeki
- Preceded by: Jeff Radebe
- Succeeded by: Brigitte Mabandla

Minister of Trade and Industry
- In office 4 April 1996 – 28 April 2004
- Succeeded by: Mandisi Mpahlwa

Personal details
- Born: 17 January 1948 (age 78) Cape Town, South Africa
- Party: African National Congress
- Education: University of Natal

Alexander Erwin (born 17 January 1948) is a South African politician who was Minister of Public Enterprises from 29 April 2004 to 25 September 2008.

== Early life and education ==
Alexander Erwin was born on 17 January 1948 in Cape Town to Dennis and Rosamund Erwin. Alec, as he became known, matriculated from Durban High School in 1965. He then went to study at the University of Natal and received a B.Econ. (Honours) degree in 1970. After receiving his degree he became a lecturer in the Department of Economics at the university between 1971 and 1978. Erwin was also a visiting lecturer at the Centre of Southern African Studies at the University of York for a year between 1974 and 1975. Between 1973 and 1975, Erwin served as a member of the Institute of Industrial Education.

== Involvement in Labour Unions ==
After the 1973 Durban strikes, Erwin was part of the group of White activists from the National Union of South African Students who participated and held positions in the African trade unions that were subsequently formed. In 1977, while lecturing, Erwin was elected as General Secretary of the Trade Union Advisory Co-ordinating Council. In 1979 Erwin was elected as General Secretary of the newly founded the Federation of South African Trade Unions, a position he held until 1983. He was a branch secretary for the National Union of Textile Workers in 1981 for two years. Erwin became Education Secretary of the Federation of South African Trade Unions in 1983 and held that position until 1985. He then held the same position within the Congress of South African Trade Unions between 1986 and 1988. In 1988 Erwin was elected as a national executive officer of the National Union of Metalworkers of South Africa and remained an officer until 1993. During the negotiations between the apartheid government and the anti-apartheid movement, Erwin was appointed as a member of the Development and Reconstruction Committee, a structure of the National Peace Accord Trust. In 1990 he became an Executive member of the African National Congress Western Areas branch and in 1991 he was an interim executive member of their Southern Natal region.

== Minister of Public Enterprises ==
As Minister of State Enterprise Erwin was criticised for the handling of the Eskom crisis. Eskom reported in to his department. In November 2005 the first electricity load shedding started in the Western Cape, due to problems at Koeberg Power plant. He blamed sabotage as the reason, which was later proven to be wrong. He defended bonuses paid out to Eskom managers. He also stated there was neither a capacity nor a management problem at Eskom in 2006.

== Political career ==
Following the resignation of President Thabo Mbeki in September 2008, Erwin was among those members of the Cabinet who submitted their resignations on 23 September.

Trade union offices
Preceded by New position	President of the Federation of South African Trade Unions; 1979–1983	Succeeded by Joe Foster
