= Mthuthuzeli Tom =

South African trade union leader

Mthuthuzeli Tom (7 September 1959 – 27 August 2010) was a South African trade union leader.

Born in Mpongo, near East London, Eastern Cape, Tom's family was forcibly relocated to Mdantsane when he was seven years old. He attended Khulani Commercial High School until 1980, then began working as a welder for Mercedes-Benz. He joined the South African Automobile Workers' Union, and was soon elected as a shop steward. He also became active in the East London Youth Congress, and through it, the United Democratic Front.

In 1983, Tom transferred to the National Automobile and Allied Workers' Union, on whose behalf he was involved in the negotiations which formed the Congress of South African Trade Unions, in 1985. In 1987 he was the lead from his union in the negotiations which established the National Union of Metalworkers of South Africa (NUMSA). In 1988, he was elected as deputy chairperson of NUMSA, as first deputy president in 1991, then in 1992 as president.

Tom retired in 2008 due to poor health, and died from lung cancer two years later.

Trade union offices
Preceded by Maxwell Xulu	President of the National Union of Metalworkers of South Africa; 1992–2008	Succeeded by Cedric Gina
