= Myrtle Witbooi =

South African labour activist (1947–2023)

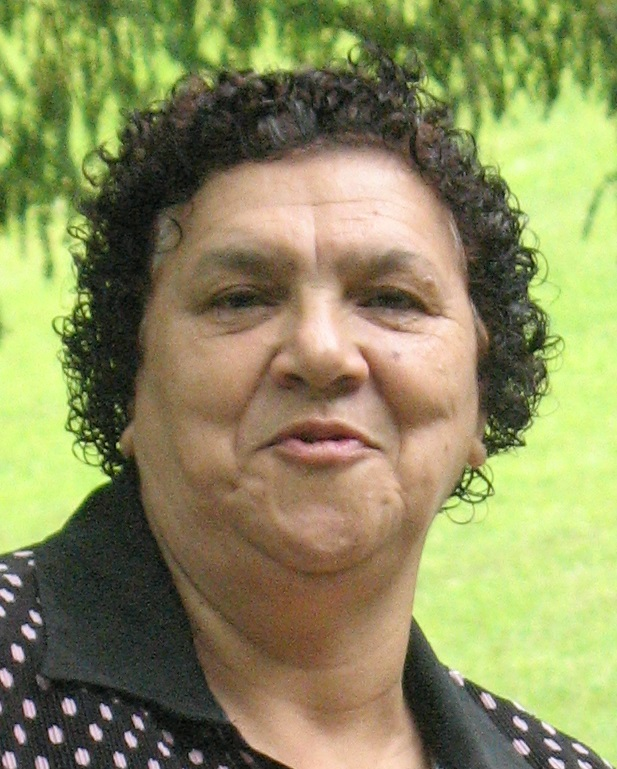
- Witbooi at an IDWF meeting in June 2010
- Born: 31 August 1947; Genadendal, South Africa
- Died: 16 January 2023 (aged 75); Cape Town, South Africa
- Known for: Union organising and leadership: SADWU, SADSAWU, IDWF

Myrtle Witbooi (née Michels, 31 August 1947 – 16 January 2023) was a South African labour activist. She co-founded the first labour organisation for South African domestic workers, the South African Domestic Workers' Union, and served as general secretary of its successor, the South African Domestic Service and Allied Workers Union, and as the first president of the global International Domestic Workers Federation.

== Personal and work life ==
Witbooi was born in 1947 in the town of Genadendal, the daughter of a carpenter and a cook. She became a domestic worker in Cape Town when she was 17 and worked for a family for 12 years before leaving to become a shop steward in a factory. In 1973 she married Cedric Francois Witbooi, an electrical technician; they had three children. Classified as "coloured" under South Africa's apartheid laws, she had to live apart from her family while in domestic service. The couple parted in the 1980s because of her long hours in union work, and her husband predeceased her. After developing a rare form of bone cancer, she died in Cape Town in January 2023, at the age of 75.

== Activism ==
After the Cape Town Clarion published a letter from her in 1971 objecting to the treatment of domestic workers, asking "Why are we not seen as people?", the newspaper facilitated the first organisational meeting for domestic workers in South Africa and invited her to address it. More than 300 people attended. Other meetings were held in Witbooi's employers' garage and in churches in order to evade apartheid bans on gatherings of non-whites. In the mid-1980s, with Florence de Villiers, she founded the South African Domestic Workers' Union (SADWU), the first labour organisation for domestic workers in South Africa; after its dissolution in 1996, she became general secretary of its post-apartheid successor, the South African Domestic and Allied Workers Union (SADSAWU).

As head of SADWU, Witbooi worked with the Congress of South African Trade Unions toward national liberation, and she also joined the African National Congress. She was imprisoned three times for her political activities and was almost killed in a bombing at the Community House. Even after the 1994 election, domestic workers were excluded from short-term unemployment compensation; in the early 2000s, Witbooi and four others chained themselves to the gates of the Houses of Parliament, resulting in the passage of the first national labour laws to include domestic workers. She continued to fight for minimum wage increases, fair compensation for commuters, and payment for on-the-job injuries for domestic workers. Her efforts secured unemployment and maternity insurance for domestic workers in South Africa.

As general secretary of SADSAWU, Witbooi was also a leader in the international coalition of domestic workers that secured passage in June 2011 of the International Labour Organization Convention on Decent Work for Domestic Workers, making an influential speech at the 2010 convention. Convention 189 was the first international labour standard to ensure domestic workers the same basic rights as other workers, and a watershed for involvement of informal women workers in the ILO standard-setting process. In 2014, Witbooi was elected as the first president of the International Domestic Workers Federation (IDWF), which scholars have called the "first international labor federation run by women for work dominated by women"; for 15 years she headed both the IDWF and SADSAWU.

In 2013, as general secretary of SADSAWU, Witbooi accepted the George Meany–Lane Kirkland Human Rights Award of the AFL-CIO, which recognizes international leaders and organizations who have overcome significant hurdles to fight for human rights, on behalf of the domestic workers represented by the International Domestic Workers' NetWork.

== Honours ==
In 2015, Witbooi was one of three recipients of the Global Fairness Initiative's Fairness Award, which honors outstanding leaders who dedicate themselves to bringing economic justice, fairness and equality to those living in poverty and marginalized communities.
