= Socialist Revolutionary Workers Party (South Africa) =

Political party in South Africa

- Abbreviation: SRWP
- General Secretary: Oupa Ralake
- Spokesperson: Phakamile Hlubi Majola
- National Convener: Irvin Jim
- Founder: Irvin Jim
- Founded: March 2019
- Split from: SACP
- Headquarters: Gemistone Gauteng Province
- Ideology: Communism; Marxism-Leninism
- Political position: Far-left
- International affiliation: International Peoples' Assembly
- Colours: Red; Black; Yellow

Website
- www.srwp.org.za

The Socialist Revolutionary Workers Party (SRWP) is a Marxist-Leninist communist party in South Africa. The party was founded in March 2019 after a pre-launch convention at the end of 2018.

== History ==
The roots of the SRWP lie in the split between the NUMSA union and the COSATU federation in 2013. The split was mainly caused by the growing discontention of the NUMSA leadership with the ANC, which is supported by the COSATU through the Tripartite Alliance, together with the South African Communist Party. After the split NUMSA general-secretary Irvin Jim announced the formation of a "a new united front". Together with the new SAFTU, the SRWP would be part of this new united front.

The launch in December 2018 was attended by 1,100 delegates from all provinces of South Africa in Boksburg, with delegations from residence associations and members of SAFTU unions in attendance. The party contested in the 2019 South African general election and the provincial elections in all nine provinces, failing to win any seats.

The party did not contest the 2024 election, and has shown little activity since 2022.

== Election results ==
=== National elections ===
Election	Total votes	Share of vote	Seats	+/–	Government
2019	24,439	0.14%	0 / 400	–	extraparliamentary

=== Provincial elections ===
Election	Eastern Cape		Free State		Gauteng		Kwazulu-Natal		Limpopo		Mpumalanga		North-West		Northern Cape		Western Cape	
Election	%	Seats	%	Seats	%	Seats	%	Seats	%	Seats	%	Seats	%	Seats	%	Seats	%	Seats
2019	0.24%	0/63	0.18%	0/30	0.13%	0/73	0.12%	0/80	0.10%	0/49	0.15%	0/30	0.20%	0/33	0.14%	0/30	0.15%	0/42

=== Municipal elections ===
Election	Votes	%	Seats
2021	5,444	0.02%	2
