= Oscar Mpetha =

Oscar Mpetha (5 August 1909 – 15 November 1994) was a South African trade unionist, political activist, and leader during the apartheid era.

== Personal life ==
Oscar Mpetha was born in Mount Fletcher in the Transkei on 5 August 1909. He was educated at local schools and at Adams College.

== Political career ==
In 1934 Mpetha went to Cape Town as a migrant worker. He undertook various types of unskilled employment, including as a dock worker, waiter, hospital orderly, road worker, and later in factories.

He started his union activities when he was a road labourer in 1940 and began working as an assistant foreman. He had also previously been employed as a dock worker, waiter, hospital orderly, and later as a factory worker.

Mpetha joined the Food and Canning Workers' Union when he worked at a fish canning factory in Laaiplek, he was involved as a trade unionist and political leader in the AFCWU in the late 1940s and early 1950s and in 1951 he became the General Secretary. In 1954, he joined the Communist Party, he also attended the conference of the South African Trades and Labour Council. The council was dissolved in October 1954 and the Trade Union Council of South Africa (TUCSA) was established with a constitution that accepted and registered trade unions that excluded African trade unions. In 1955, he was part of a union delegation that denounced the exclusionary racial policies of the newly formed TUCSA. He then became one of the founding members of the first non-racial trade union body in South Africa, the South African Congress of Trade Unions (SACTU)

Between 1958 and 1960, he led the Cape ANC, until it was banned. He was detained and banned under the Suppression of Communism Act until the late 1970s. After his banning order lapsed, he assisted in the successful Fatti's and Moni's strike of 1978. In August 1980 he became a founding member of the Nyanga Residents Association which campaigned for decent housing, health facilities and adequate transport for residents in the Nyanga area. In 1981 he was seen as a threat to the Apartheid regime after he issued a statement condemning the role of the police in a fatal August 1980 incident involving protestors.

In 1983 he was sentenced to five years in Pollsmoor Prison after being convicted of terrorism and inciting a riot at the Crossroads squatter camp in August 1980. In the same year he was elected as one of three co-presidents along with Archie Gumede and Albertina Sisulu of the United Democratic Front, a new umbrella group of anti-government forces. When FAWU was established in 1986, he was elected as a leader.

Later in 1981, he was released from Pollsmoor Prison on bail pending an appeal, but was re-arrested in 1985 to become the country's oldest ever political prisoner when he was 76. During this time he was held at Groote Schuur Hospital under armed guard. He suffered from partial blindness, lung problems, kidney problems and diabetes, which resulted in the amputation of both his legs. He was released from hospital detention on 15 October 1989 and, despite his poor health, took on an active role in the lead up to the first democratic election in 1994.

== Later life and death ==
Mpetha's wife died in 1986 while he was in hospital.

He was eventually released from prison on the 15 October 1989 and he continued to speak at rallies around South Africa.

He died on 15 November 1994 at his Gugulethu home.

== Recognition ==
Mpetha was the recipient of an Order for Meritorious Service (OMSS) in 2003.

In 2012, he was mentioned along with several others in an tribute by President Jacob Zuma on the occasion of the 100th Anniversary of the ANC, as one of the "working class leaders who have made an impact in the history of our struggle".

== See also ==
- South African Trades Union Council
- South African Congress of Trade Unions
