= Musicians Union of South Africa =

Trade union

MUSA
- Musicians Union of South Africa
- Headquarters: Braamfontein, South Africa
- Location: South Africa
- Members: 700
- Key people: Oupa. Lebogo, general secretary
- Affiliations: COSATU

The Musicians Union of South Africa (MUSA) was a South African trade union. It had a membership of 700 and was affiliated with the Congress of South African Trade Unions. It merged with Performing Arts Workers' Equity (PAWE) to form the Creative Workers Union of South Africa (CWUSA).
