= Msimang =

Msimang is a surname. Notable people with the surname include:

- Agnes Msimang, awarded the Order of Luthuli in 2014
- Aura Lewis, born Aurelia Msimang (1947–2015), South African singer
- Bernard Msimang, actor in Duma (2005 film)
- Christian Msimang, South African politician, member of Inkatha Freedom Party
- Fabian Msimang (born 1960), former Chief of the South African Air Force
- Gab Msimang, Co-ordinator of the South African intelligence services
- Hlubi Msimang, office administrator for Maritzburg United F.C.
- H. Selby Msimang (1886–1982), South African leader and anti-apartheid activist
- Mendi Msimang (1928–2018), African National Congress treasurer 1997–2012, husband of Manto Tshabalala-Msimang
- Manto Tshabalala-Msimang, (1940–2009), South African politician, wife of Mendi Msimang
- Mavuso Msimang, former ANC freedom fighter, founder of African Parks, father of Sisonke Msimang
- Sibusiso Msimang, South African actor, in the 2016 film Vaya
- Sisonke Msimang, South African/Australian writer and political analyst, daughter of Mavuso Msimang
- Professor Themba Christian Msimang, winner of Chairperson's Award in the South African Literary Awards in 2016
- Professor Themba Msimang, professor, member and then chair of the Heraldry Council in South Africa
- Vusi Msimang, actor in 2012 South African film Little One
- Walter Msimang, president of the Agricultural Food and Allied Democratic Workers Union as of 2020
