= Nobuntu Hlazo-Webster =

South African politician and businesswoman (born 1982)

The Honourable Nobuntu Hlazo-Webster MP
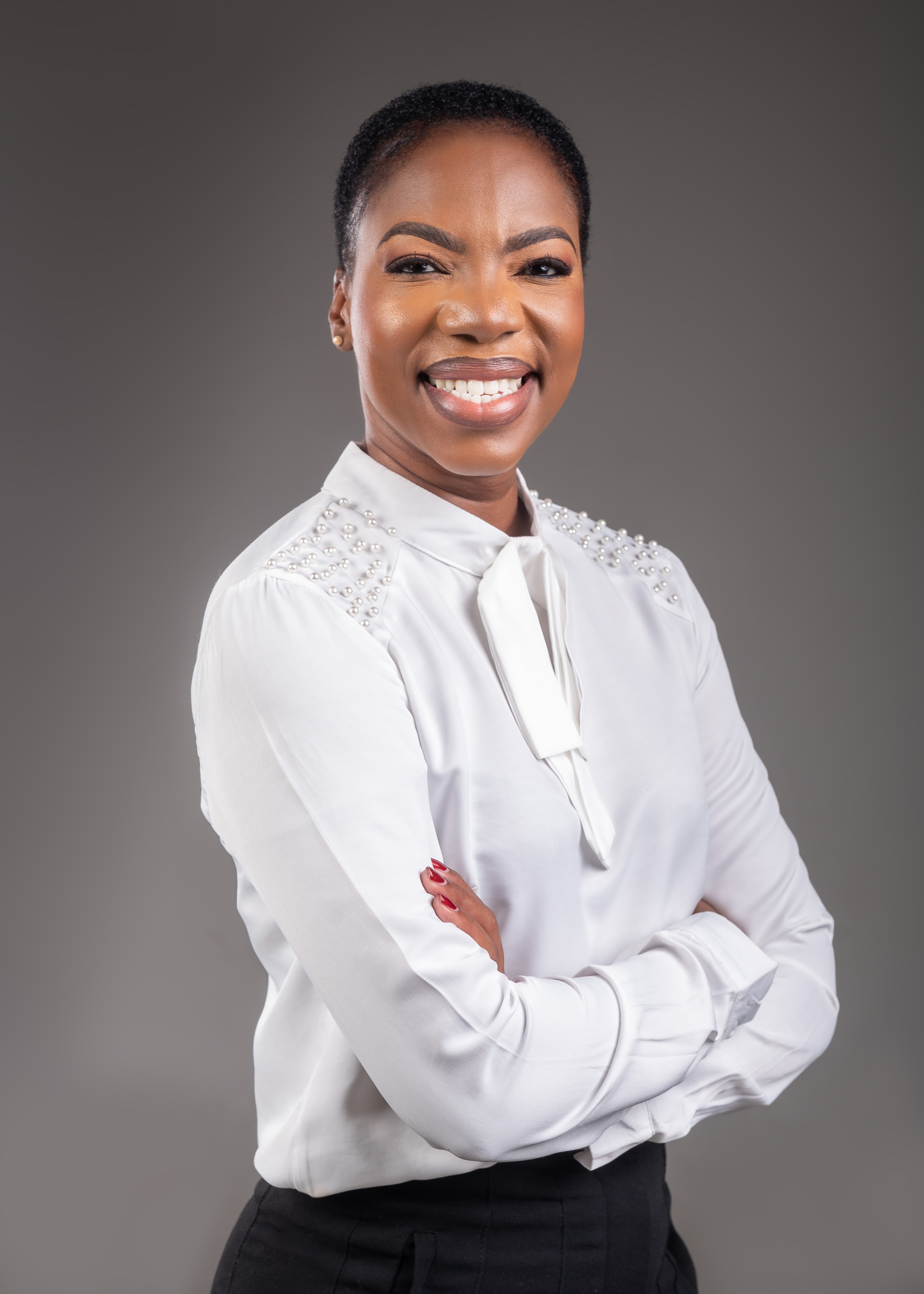

Member of the National Assembly
- Incumbent
- Assumed office 14 June 2024

Deputy Leader of Build One South Africa
- Incumbent
- Assumed office 24 September 2022
- Leader: Mmusi Maimane
- Preceded by: Party established

Personal details
- Born: Nobuntu Lindumusa Hlazo; 3 April 1982 (age 44) Lamontville, Durban; Natal, South Africa
- Party: Build One South Africa
- Spouse: Ayanda Webster (m. 2007)
- Education: IMM Graduate School

Nobuntu Lindumusa Hlazo-Webster (born 3 April 1982) is a South African politician and former businesswoman. She is the co-founder and deputy leader of Build One South Africa (BOSA), and she has represented the party in the National Assembly of South Africa since June 2024.

Born in Durban, Hlazo-Webster began her career in marketing and business consulting. Her ventures included African Pursuit, a business development consultancy. She entered politics in September 2022 when she launched BOSA with Mmusi Maimane, and she was the party's candidate for Premier of Gauteng in the May 2024 general election.

== Early life and education ==
Hlazo-Webster was born on 3 April 1982. She was born in Lamontville outside Durban, but she grew up in the nearby township of eNanda.

== Business career ==
Before entering politics, Hlazo-Webster worked in business and marketing. In 2007 she co-founded her first company, Ayano Communications, a communications and advertising firm. In 2013 she co-founded African Pursuit, a marketing and business development consultancy which she ran for the next decade; its eventual clients included South African Breweries, Engen, and government departments in Ekiti State, Nigeria and KwaZulu-Natal, South Africa. She said that her job at African Pursuit was to "commercialise dreams". In 2015 she and her African Pursuit partner, Sibahle Malunga, launched My African Buy, an online marketplace.

During this period Hlazo-Webster was also the co-host, with businessman Derek Thomas, of a short-lived SABC3 programme called Think Big. The show was a business reality competition show sponsored by Standard Bank, and its only season began airing in July 2014. In 2016 Hlazo-Webster self-published a novel called Perfect Mess Perfect Grace.

In 2018 she co-founded Avad Media, a production company which was a joint partnership with actress Ayanda Borotho and writer Dudu Busanidube.

Meanwhile, in parallel to her business pursuits, Hlazo-Webster was involved in various philanthropic and community initiatives. She founded the South African Women's Commission, a women's empowerment organisation, and chaired the Businesswomen's Association of South Africa. She also attended Futurelect, Lindiwe Mazibuko's leadership development programme, and the United States International Visitor Leadership Programme, and she was a fellow of the International Women's Forum.

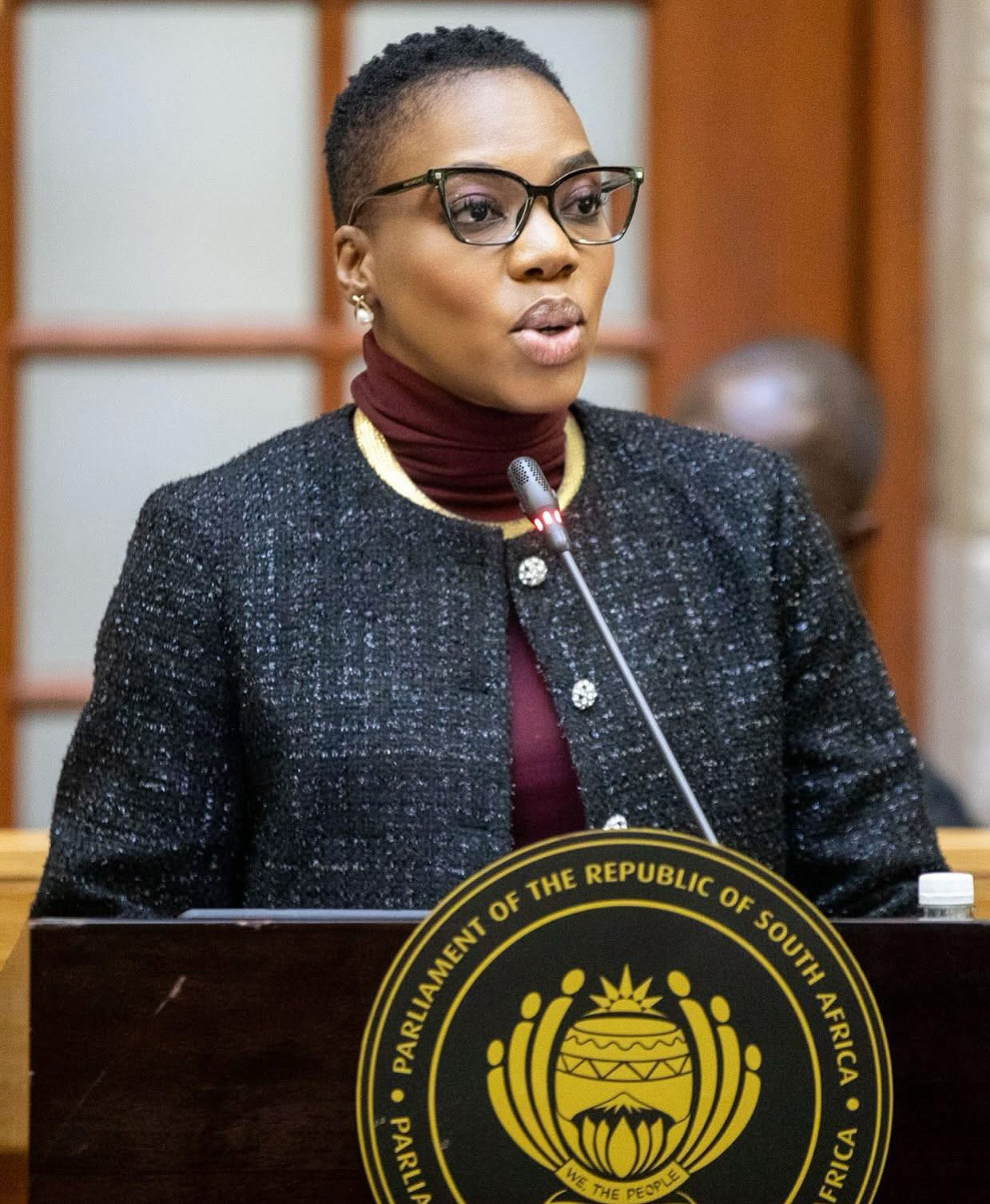
Hlazo-Webster in parliament.

== Political career ==
On 24 September 2022, Mmusi Maimane launched his new political party, Build One South Africa (BOSA). At the party's launch in Soweto, Hlazo-Webster was introduced as the party's co-founder and deputy leader. When asked about her entrance into politics, she said that, "There comes a time when you can no longer sit on the sidelines. I felt that all the things I was doing were not enough".

On 2 April 2024, at another event in Soweto, Hlazo-Webster was unveiled as BOSA's candidate for election as Premier of Gauteng in the upcoming general election. Her campaign platform focused on the economy. Alongside her provincial campaign, she was ranked second on BOSA's party list for election to the national Parliament of South Africa.

When the election was held in May 2024, BOSA won only one seat in the Gauteng Provincial Legislature. Maimane announced that the Gauteng seat would be filled by Ayanda Allie, while Hlazo-Webster would join him in Parliament as one of the party's two national representatives. After she was sworn in to the National Assembly on 14 June, Hlazo-Webster was appointed as a member of the Portfolio Committee on Water and Sanitation, a member of the Portfolio Committee on Small Business Development, and an alternate member of the Portfolio Committee on Trade, Industry and Competition.

== Personal life ==
Hlazo-Webster is Christian. She married Ayanda Webster in 2007; they have two sons. Together the couple convened a non-denominational religious group, the Salt and Light Tribe; founded a non-profit organisation called Phatha; and launched a vlog series about their marriage, Love on the Reel. They moved to Gauteng in 2011.

Hlazo-Webster was a close friend to environmental activist Ndoni Mcunu and acted as a spokesperson for Mchunu's family after her death in 2022.
