= Liberated Metalworkers' Union of South Africa =

Trade union in South Africa

The Liberated Metalworkers' Union of South Africa (LIMUSA) was a trade union representing workers in metal and related industries in South Africa.

== History ==
In November 2014, the National Union of Metalworkers of South Africa (NUMSA) disaffiliated from the Congress of South African Trade Unions (COSATU). Cedric Gina, the former president of NUMSA, wished to remain part of COSATU, and he led a group of members out of the union, immediately founding LIMUSA. The new union was accepted as an affiliate of COSATU in March 2015, at which time it had 7,771 members. In 2019, it was announced that the union would soon merge into the National Union of Mineworkers. The merger was completed in 2021.

== Leadership ==
=== General Secretaries ===
2014: Cedric Gina
2018: Siboniso Mdletshe

=== Presidents ===
2014: Sifiso Maphumulo
2015: Siboniso Mdletshe
2018: Thabiso Peter Mothloki
