= Food and Canning Workers' Union =

Union

The Food and Canning Workers' Union (FCWU) was a trade union representing food processing workers in South Africa. Its members were mainly based in the Western and Eastern Cape. It was affiliate with the African Food and Canning Workers' Union (AFCWU).

== Background ==
The union was established in 1941 by Ray Alexander. It was a founder member of the South African Congress of Trade Unions and spread through the fruit canning industry of the Boland, Western Cape and up the west coast among fishing communities. Many of the members were women. It was open to all races when it formed though the majority of its members were coloured with a minor African membership. It was registered under the Industrial Conciliation Act, which banned black people who carried passes, something African females did not need at that time of its formation. By 1945, the union was being harassed by the Department of Labour, raiding it constantly to force it to remove its black members. It would result in the formation of the African Food and Canning Workers' Union and the two unions met and acted together. Oscar Mpetha became the General Secretary of a sister union, the African Food and Canning Workers' Union, in 1951.

In 1945 it obtained a Wage Determination for the fish canning industry which improved wages and working conditions. After the National Party won in 1948, and with the establishment of its Apartheid policy, it would suffer the banning of several Secretary's and other union officials. It was a founding member of the South African Congress of Trade Unions (SACTU) in 1955 and made up a third of the latter union's affiliate members with many of its leaders becoming prominent in that union.

The union went through a lengthy decline, but it was re-established in 1977. By 1979, it had about 25,000 members, and that year, it organised a successful consumer boycott, and the following year, this led to an agreement with Fattis & Monis.

In about 1980, the union absorbed the African Food and Canning Workers' Union, which represented black workers. The union did not affiliate to the Federation of South African Trade Unions, being more openly political than its members, joining the United Democratic Front. In 1982, Neil Aggett was the leader of the union, though unpaid. He was detained on 27 November 1981 and died in detention.

The union was a founding affiliate of the Congress of South African Trade Unions in 1985, the longest-established union to join. The following year, it amalgamated with the Sweet, Food and Allied Workers' Union and the Retail and Allied Workers' Union, to form the Food and Allied Workers Union.

== General Secretaries ==
1941: Ray Alexander
1953: Becky Lan
1956: Liz Abrahams
1964: John Mentoor
1976: Jan Theron
