= South African Security Forces Union =

Trade union in South Africa

The South African Security Forces Union (SASFU) is a trade union representing military personnel in South Africa.

Trade unions were first permitted to organise members of the Military of South Africa following a South African Constitutional Court decision in May 1999. In December 1999, SASFU was formed, and it soon affiliated to the Congress of South African Trade Unions (COSATU).

By 2011, the union had about 11,000 members. The Ministry of Defence was keen to de-unionise the military, and argued that, as the union had fewer than 15,000 members, it was not required to negotiate with it. The Registrar of Trade Unions deregistered the union, claiming that it had not provided required documents. It was later permitted to re-register, but lost most of its membership. In 2016, it had fewer than 1,000 members, and suffered internal splits which led to a criminal case against some of its leadership.
