= South African Municipal Workers' Union =

Trade union in South Africa

SAMWU
- South African Municipal Workers' Union
- Founded: 1987
- Headquarters: Johannesburg, Gauteng, South Africa
- Location: South Africa
- Members: 160,000
- Key people: Nkhetheni Muthavhi, President; Dumisane Magagula, General Secretary; Papikie Mohale, National Spokesperson
- Affiliations: COSATU, PSI
- Website: www.samwu.org.za

The South African Municipal Workers Union (SAMWU) is the largest union in local government in South Africa.

== History ==
The union was founded on 24 October 1987, when the Municipal Workers' Union of South Africa merged with the Cape Town Municipal Workers' Association (CTMWA), and the municipal workers' sections of General Workers' Union of South Africa, South African Allied Workers' Union and Transport and General Workers' Union. All of these unions were affiliates of the Congress of South African Trade Unions, to which SAMWU also affiliated. In later years, SAMWU absorbed the Durban Indian Municipal Employees' Society and the Union of Johannesburg Municipal Workers.

Initially, the union grew rapidly, and by 1994 it had 100,410 members, 31.3% of all eligible workers. The union led opposition to privatisation schemes, and was particularly active in opposing the privatisation of a water treatment plant in Johannesburg. In 2002, it led a national three-week strike for higher wages.

In 2009, the union's leadership was voted out, and disagreements around this led the Democratic Municipal and Allied Workers' Union of South Africa and the Municipal and Allied Trade Union of South Africa to split away over the next few years. The leadership lost a vote of confidence in 2019 and were replaced. The new leaders found that the union was highly indebted, with some funds having been spent on legal costs and some was used for inappropriate purposes. In addition, membership was in decline. In 2020, the union declared that it might withdraw support for the African National Congress government.

Membership of the union is open to South African workers employed, directly or indirectly, in local authorities, water utilities and allied undertakings of the economy whether in the public, private or voluntary sector, including: public administrative services in municipalities and local authorities, health and social services, libraries, cultural and other community services, water and sanitation, solid-waste management and environmental services, road construction and storm-water drainage, electricity generation and distribution, public transportation and traffic control, telecommunication and information services, scientific and technical services, and parks and recreation.

== Leadership ==
=== General Secretaries ===
1987: John Ernstzen
1990s: Roger Ronnie
Walter Theledi
2015: Simon Mathe
2019: Koena Ramotlou
2021: Dumisane Magagula

=== Presidents ===
1987: Petrus Mashishi
2009: Sam Molope
Pule Molalenyane
2019: John Dlamini
2020: Nelson Mokgotho
2026: Nkhetheni Muthavhi
