= Chris Dlamini =

South African trade unionist

Christopher Ndodebandla Dlamini (born 10 October 1944 – 19 November 2009) was a South African trade union leader.

Dlamini grew up in Benoni and Springs. He became aware of the African National Congress at an early age, and saw himself as a supporter of the organisation, although he did not join. He was expelled from school in 1963, and began working in the stores at Sanbra Engineering. In 1973, he joined the new Engineering and Allied Workers' Union, and at the end of the year took part in a short strike which achieved an increased Christmas bonus.

In 1974, Dlamini moved to work for Rank Xerox, and sat on the company liaison committee, but found it was far less effective than a trade union. When he moved to work for Kellogg's in 1977, he joined the Sweet, Food and Allied Workers' Union (SFAWU), and helped recruit other workers at the factory. He became a shop steward in 1979. Many of the union's members were unhappy with its leadership, and Dlamini won election as the union's president, taking it into the new Federation of South African Trade Unions (FOSATU).

In 1977, Dlamini joined the Azanian People's Organisation, but found it ineffective. At some point in the 1980s, he instead joined the South African Communist Party, and later became part of its leadership. In 1984, he was a founder of the East Rand People's Organisation, which organised a two-day general strike in the Transvaal. This resulted in his arrest on the charge of "economic sabotage".

Dlamini was elected as president of FOSATU in 1982, and from 1984 worked full time between that role and his shop steward work. He supported the merger of FOSATU into the new Congress of South African Trade Unions (COSATU), and was elected as the new federation's vice president. COSATU encouraged mergers of unions in the same industry, and Dlamini led SFAWU into the new Food and Allied Workers' Union in 1986, becoming its founding president.

In 1988, Dlamini was an organiser of a major anti-apartheid conference, as a result of which, he was banned and prohibited from leaving his house for ten days. He was part of a delegation which visited Nelson Mandela in prison in 1989, and in 1990, he took part in meetings with the leadership of the newly unbanned ANC.

Trade union offices
Preceded by John Mke	President of the Federation of South African Trade Unions; 1982–1985	Succeeded by Federation merged
Preceded by New position	Second Deputy President of the Congress of South African Trade Unions; 1985–1993	Succeeded by Connie September
Preceded by New position	President of the Food and Allied Workers' Union; 1986–1993	Succeeded by E. Theron
