= Pawe =

Pawe or PAWE may mean:

- Pawe Special Woreda, a woreda (type of division) of Ethiopia
- Paveh, a city in Iran
- Performing Arts Workers' Equity, a trade union in South Africa
