= Elijah Barayi =

South African trade union leader

Elijah Barayi (15 June 1930 – 24 January 1994) was a South African trade union leader.

Born in Lingelihle Cradock, Barayi was one of eight children that, all came from a working-class family. Cradock was known for being a politically active town, which later on became known as the "Cradock Four" for anti-apartheid activism. Elijah Barayi studied at Lwana Primary School, and he also got his certificate at Nuwell High School. Barayi joined the ANC Youth League as a teenager in 1952. He was arrested in the early 1950s for being a participant in the Defiance Campaign. The Defiance Campaign was known as the first civil disobedience since the apartheid laws were set in place. This campaign involved many volunteers from different areas of South Africa, who broke these apartheid laws on purpose to shed light on the injustice done against them. He and many others were arrested during a state of emergency after the Sharpeville Massacre on 21 March 1960. This was seen as a turning point in ANC activism, which pushed many activists underground. Barayi aspired to study at Fort Hare University, which produced many notable African leaders, including Oliver Tambo and Nelson Mandela. His family was unable to afford tuition, so he instead became a clerk at the Department of Native Affairs, which is a government office that was responsible for enforcing apartheid policies. Later, he decided to resign from this job because he viewed the department as enforcing discrimination. This decision reflected his stance on social and political justice.

== Political activism ==
In 1952, Barayi joined the African National Congress (ANC) and worked closely with James Calata. James Calata was the ANC Secretary General. He participated in the Defiance Campaign, which was organized by the South African Indian Congress and the ANC, presenting himself at a local police station without papers after curfew, for which he was sentenced to one month in prison.

After the Sharpeville Massacre that took place on 21 March 1960, the South African government decided to ban the ANC and declare a state of emergency. Barayi was again arrested and held for five months. His repeated arrests showed that political activists that were being oppressed under apartheid laws, and this experience has made him more determined to fight discrimination.

In the 1980s, Elijah Barayi's attention became more occupied by the labor movement. In 1982, he founded the National Union of Mineworkers (NUM). This became one of the most notable trade unions in South Africa. By joining the National Union of Mineworkers, this marked the start of a new direction of bringing labor organization and politics together.

== Trade union career ==
Following the release, he moved to Brakpan to escape police harassment and found work as a personnel officer at a gold mine. In 1973, he moved to a similar role in Carletonville and was elected as the chair of the mine's liaison committee. These committees were designed by mining companies to limit the amount of worker influence, which reinforced Barayi's view that workers deserved fair representation. He attempted to use the role to oppose racial discrimination and the underpayment of many of the Black workers, and was banned by management from standing for a second term.

While Barayi was being restricted, he still continued to influence the mineworkers. His experience in Carletonville showed many of the limitations that were put onto people by the Liaison Committee, which was controlled by management, and this all happened because they didn't want workers to have good representation. This frustration pushed him to take a stronger stand in support of labor organizing. Going into the late 1970s, Barayi had become a significant voice in labor activism. He stood against the apartheid practices that were happening in the mining industry.

== COSATU leadership ==
In 1981, Barayi met Cyril Ramaphosa, and this inspired him to become a founding member of the National Union of Mineworkers (NUM). He was elected as a shaft steward, and then in 1983 as the union's vice president. This commitment to his opposition to racial discrimination and to worker solidarity in the mining industry showed his authentic leadership.

In 1985, he led a strike of 9,000 workers at the mine, raising his profile. This strike demonstrated the strength of workers' organizations, which forced management to negotiate.Later in the year, the NUM affiliated with the new Congress of South African Trade Unions (COSATU), and Barayi was elected president. During his time as president, the Congress of South African Trade Unions became a force for the anti-apartheid continuation. This mobilized workers in different industries to join together in this movement.

As COSATU president, Barayi strongly opposed the pass laws, which restricted the movement of Black South Africans, and called for disinvestment in South Africa. This pressure is on the government and their apartheid laws. This activism he showed led to him being arrested in 1986 and detained for two weeks without charge. Barayi continued to fight for democracy in the labor movement, which aligned the Congress of South African Trade Unions as a union group, but was also seen as a political player in the apartheid.

== Death and legacy ==
In 1991, Barayi stood down as president of COSATU and retired fully in 1993. He died in 1994, before South Africa's first democratic election.

Congress of South African Trade Unions leaders described Barayi as someone who fought hard to bridge the space between national pride and any workplace struggles, which was to ensure that labor rights were directly tied to the anti-apartheid movement. The South African government has recognized him and his contributions during Workers' Month and published him in many memorial publications.

Barayi's legacy continues in South Africa's democracy. His push for non-racial unions and international solidarity continues to be a principle in the Congress of South African Trade Unions and in other labor unions across the world.
