= Sweet, Food and Allied Workers' Union =

Trade union in South Africa

Logo of the union

The Sweet, Food and Allied Workers' Union (SFAWU) was a trade union representing food processing workers in South Africa.

The union was founded in February 1974 in Durban, with the assistance of the Urban Training Project. By 1977, it had spread to other regions of the country. In 1979, its general secretary, Skakes Sikhakhane, lost a bid for re-election, and left to form the rival Food and Beverage Workers' Union. Later in the year, the SFAWU was a founding affiliate of the Federation of South African Trade Unions. It grew steadily, from 400 members in 1974, to 5,000 in 1981, and by 1982 it claimed to have organised all the workers in its sector. That year, it absorbed the small Eastern Province Sweet, Food and Allied Workers' Union.

In 1985, the union was a founding affiliate of the new Congress of South African Trade Unions, at which time it had 19,596 members. The following year, it merged with the Food and Canning Workers' Union and the Retail and Allied Workers' Union, to form the Food and Allied Workers Union.

== General Secretaries ==
1974: Skakes Sikhakhane
1979: Maggie Magubane

== Presidents ==
1979: Chris Dlamini
