= General Workers' Union (South Africa) =

Trade union in South Africa

The General Workers' Union (GWU) was a general union representing workers in South Africa.

The union was founded in 1977, on the initiative of the Western Province Workers' Advice Bureau. It was initially named the Western Province General Workers' Union, but expanded across the country in 1980, becoming the "General Workers' Union". By that point, it had 13,300 members. Unlike the majority of South African trade unions, it represented all workers, regardless of ethnicity, although the large majority were black. The union focused on co-ordinating independent committees of workers, and was strongly opposed to registration with the Government of South Africa.

While remaining open to all workers, the union decided to strengthen its position by recruiting in specific industries. It gained recognition among dock workers in Durban, becoming the first of the group of unions founded in the 1970s to sign a recognition agreement. It did not affiliate to the Federation of South African Trade Unions, generally being considered to be more political and slightly more left-wing than its members. Despite its political activism, it refused to affiliate with any specific party or movement.

In 1985, the union became a founding affiliate of the Congress of South African Trade Unions. The following year, it merged into the Transport and General Workers' Union.
