= General Workers' Union of South Africa =

Trade union in South Africa

The General Workers' Union of South Africa (GWUSA) was a general union in South Africa.

The union's origins lay in the split of the Port Elizabeth-based Motor Assemblers' and Component Workers' Union from the United Union of Automobile, Rubber and Allied Workers of South Africa. The new union attracted support from some workers in other industries, and so in 1981 established GWUSA to organise them.

While initially successful, the union's membership fell back to 2,905 by 1985. That year, it affiliated to the new Congress of South African Trade Unions. In 1987, it was dissolved, members joining various industrial unions, such as the South African Municipal Workers' Union and the Construction and Allied Workers' Union.
