= Wendy Luhabe =

South African businesswoman

Wendy Yvonne Nomathemba Luhabe
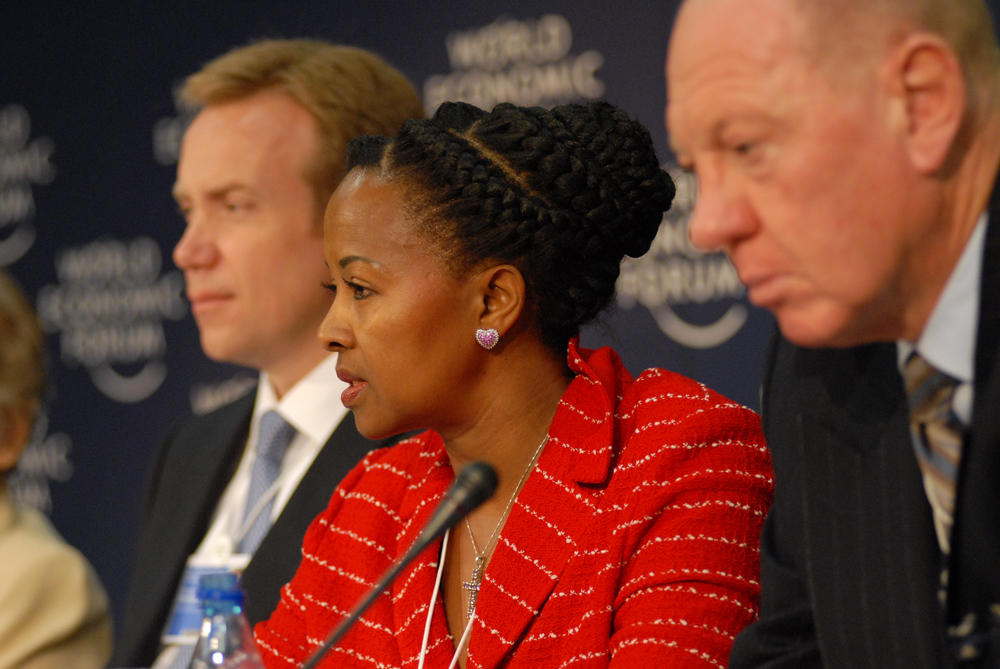
- Born: 29 May 1957 (age 68)
- Occupation: Entrepreneur

Wendy Yvonne Nomathemba Luhabe (born 29 May 1957) is a South African entrepreneur.

== Life and career ==
Luhabe was born in Daveyton, Gauteng, South Africa, and grew up in the old Benoni location.

She graduated in arts from the University of Fort Hare (1977) and in Commerce from the National University of Lesotho (1981). After 10 years of national and international corporate experience with f.e. BMW she founded Bridging the Gap in 1991, a consulting firm to prepare young black South Africans to enter the world of work and to support South African companies in integrating those people into their corporate business.

Luhabe founded the Women Investment Holdings in 1993: initiating the participation of women in the economic landscape of South Africa. She launched the first fund to provide capital to women-owned businesses in South Africa with an R120 million private equity fund.

In 1999 she was recognised as one of the 50 Leading Women Entrepreneurs of the World. The World Economic Forum in Switzerland recognised her as a Global Leader of Tomorrow. She was inaugurated as a Chancellor of the University of Johannesburg in 2006. She was appointed Honorary Lieutenant of the Royal Victorian Order (LVO) in the 2014 New Year Honours for her services as a trustee of the Duke of Edinburgh's International Award Foundation. 2020 Forbes listed her as one of Africas 50 most powerful women.

She is married to the former premier of Gauteng, Mbhazima Shilowa, they have 4 children and a grandson.

== Publication ==
- Defining moments. University of KwaZulu-Natal, 2002, ISBN 978-1-86914-020-5
