= South African Emergency Personnel's Union =

Trade union in South Africa

The South African Emergency Personnel's Union (SAEPU) is a trade union representing paramedics, firefighters and related workers in South Africa.

The union was founded in 2006 in Jane Furse by M. M. Disegoane, F. K. Maila and S. T. Sithole. It was registered with the government in 2008 and soon spread across the country. In 2017, it became affiliated to the Congress of South African Trade Unions. By 2018, it had about 7,000 members. That year, it advised its members to carry arms to protect themselves from attacks during the festive season.
