= South African Agricultural Plantation and Allied Workers Union =

Trade union in South Africa, 1995 to 2004

- South African Agricultural Plantation and Allied Workers Union
- Merged into: Food and Allied Workers Union
- Founded: February 1995
- Dissolved: 2004
- Headquarters: Braamfontein, South Africa
- Location: South Africa
- Members: 22,000
- Affiliations: COSATU

The South African Agricultural Plantation and Allied Workers Union (SAAPAWU) was a trade union representing agricultural and plantation workers in South Africa.

The union was founded in February 1995, on the initiative of the Congress of South African Trade Unions, which wanted one single union to represent all farm workers. Its initial membership was mostly drawn from the Food and Allied Workers Union (FAWU), the Paper, Wood and Allied Workers' Union, the Southern African Clothing and Textile Workers Union, and the National Farm and Allied Workers Union.

The union initially had 35,000 members, but it failed to grow, and in 2004, it merged into FAWU.
