= Municipal Workers' Union of South Africa =

Trade union in South Africa

The Municipal Workers' Union of South Africa (MWUSA) was a trade union representing local government workers in South Africa.

== History ==
The union was founded in 1980, as the Black Municipal Workers' Union. It had 9,000 members and was based in Johannesburg. Two years later, a section of the union led by Dlamini split away, to form the rival South African Black Municipal and Allied Workers' Union. The majority later changed the union's name to the Municipal and General Workers' Union of South Africa, and then in 1985 shortened it to the "Municipal Workers' Union of South Africa". That year, it was a founding affiliate of the Congress of South African Trade Unions, at which point it had 9,249 members. Two years later, it merged with the Cape Town Municipal Workers' Association and sections of other unions, to form the South African Municipal Workers' Union.

== General Secretaries ==
1980: J. Mavi
1980s: Johnson Gamede
