= South African State and Allied Workers' Union =

Trade union in South Africa

SASAWU
- South African State and Allied Workers' Union
- Founded: 2000
- Headquarters: Braamfontein, South Africa
- Location: South Africa
- Members: 144,000
- Key people: Zwelihle Ngonyama, president Mthimkhulu Mashiya, general secretary
- Affiliations: COSATU

The South African State and Allied Workers' Union (SASAWU) is a trade union representing public sector workers in South Africa.

The union was founded on 14 July 2000. Until 2015, it was affiliated with the Congress of South African Trade Unions, but it has since been independent.
