= Agricultural Food and Allied Democratic Workers Union =

South African trade union

AFADWU
- Agricultural Food and Allied Democratic Workers Union
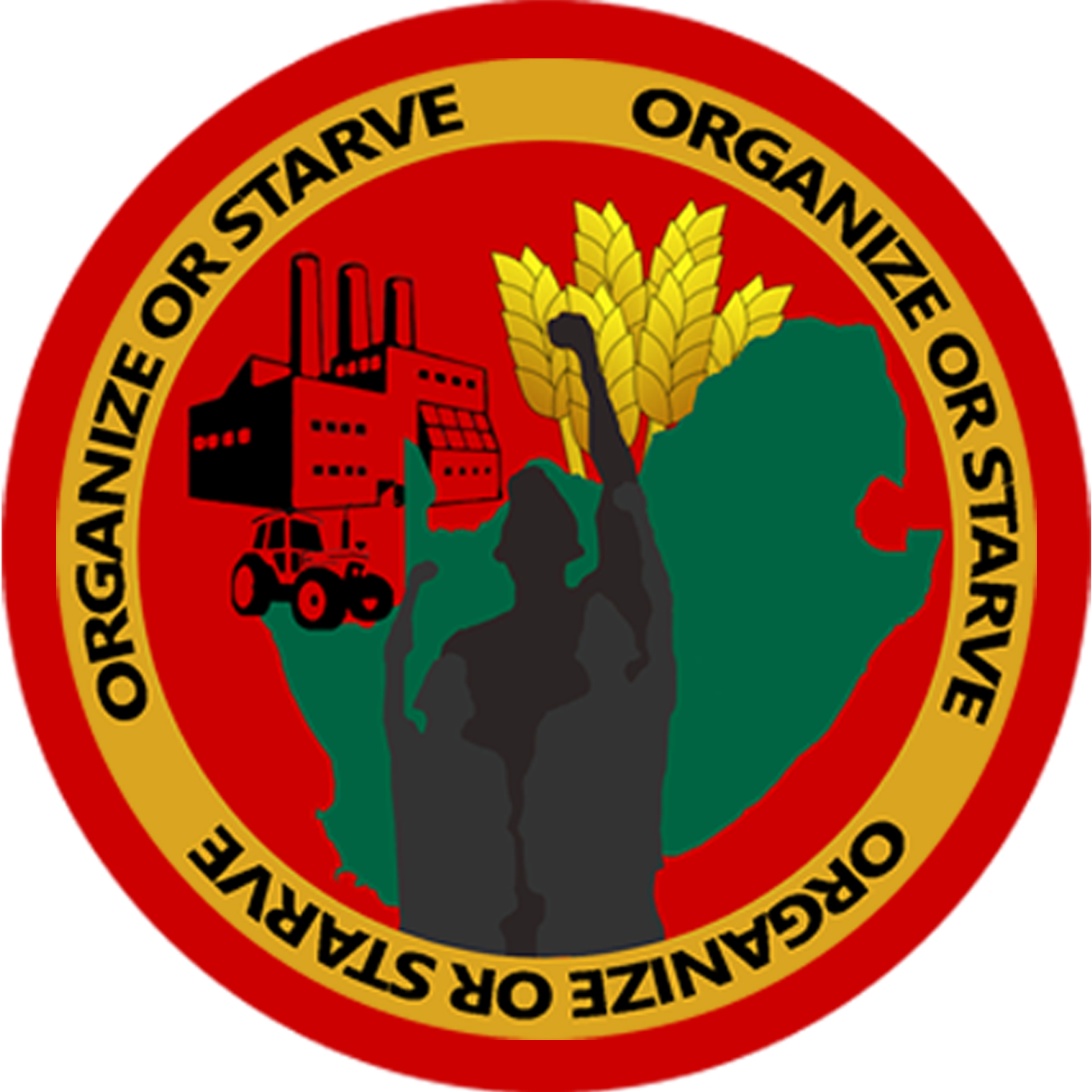
- Predecessor: Thupudi Mabunele
- Successor: Mlamleli Pukwana
- Founded: September 2016; 9 years ago
- Headquarters: Johannesburg, South Africa
- Key people: Walter Msimang; Tumi Seitshiro; Phumla Gxalaba; Nelisiwe Nxumalo
- Affiliations: COSATU
- Website: afadwu.org.za

The Agricultural Food and Allied Democratic Workers Union (AFADWU) is a trade union representing food processing workers in South Africa.

The union was founded in 2016 after the dismissal of an army of worker leaders, shop stewards and officials by the Food and Allied Workers Union (FAWU). FAWU also disaffiliated from the Congress of South African Trade Unions (COSATU).

AFADWU is an association of employees whose principal purpose is to regulate relations between employees and employers, including any employers' organisations. On the 17th of April 2018, AFADWU was legally registered with the Department of Employment and Labour in terms of the Labour Relations Act No 66 of 1995 as amended.

In 2018, AFADWU was accepted as an affiliate of COSATU.

== Leadership ==
=== 2020 (current officeholders) ===
==== Current national office bearers ====
President	Walter Msimang
1st deputy president	Tumi Seitshiro
2nd deputy president	Phumla Gxalaba
General secretary	Mlamleli Pukwana
Deputy general secretary	Thupudi Mabunele
National treasurer	Nelisiwe Nxumalo

==== Current provincial secretaries ====
Eastern Cape: Victor Mbaza | Free State: Thulani Klass | Gauteng: Lucas Mbambo | KwaZulu-Natal: Mtokhona Ngcobo | Limpopo: Jan Maifala | Mpumalanga: Elias Mgwenya | Western Cape: Michael Helu

=== 2018 (previous officeholders) ===
==== Previous national office bearers ====
President	Norman Chauke
1st deputy president	Walter Msimang
2nd deputy president	Philip Mochane
General secretary	Thupudi Mabunele
Deputy general secretary	Howard Mbana
National treasurer	Martha Lukhele

== Campaigns ==
Buy Local Campaign

AFADWU, the FairPlay Movement, Proudly South African and other trade unions have launched a campaign to promote the consumption of local chicken.
