= Performing Arts Workers' Equity =

Trade union in South Africa

PAWE
- Performing Arts Workers' Equity
- Headquarters: Braamfontein, South Africa
- Location: South Africa
- Members: 365
- Key people: Mabutho Sithole, president Kagiso Senkge, general secretary
- Affiliations: COSATU

The Performing Arts Workers' Equity (PAWE) was a small trade union in South Africa. It had a membership of only 365, but was affiliated to the Congress of South African Trade Unions. It merged with the Musicians Union of South Africa (MUSA) to form the Creative Workers Union of South Africa (CWUSA).
