= Irvin Jim =

South African trade union leader (born 1968)

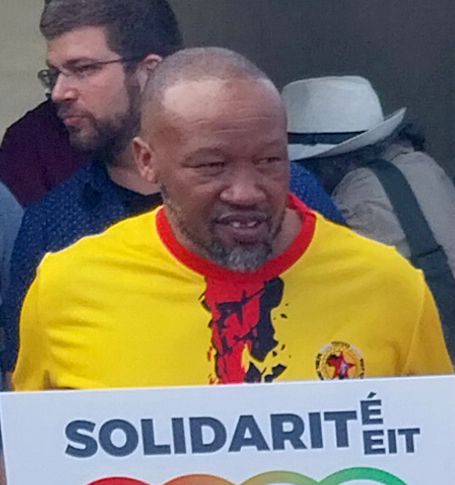
Irvin Jim at ManiFiesta 2024

Irvin Jim (born 1968) is a South African trade union leader.

Born in on a farm in the Eastern Cape, Jim grew up in Motherwell. He became a university student, active in the anti-apartheid movement, but had to leave education to earn money in a tyre factory in Port Elizabeth, where he joined the National Union of Metalworkers of South Africa (NUMSA). Within three months, he was a shop steward, and by 1993 was working full-time for the union. In 1994, he was appointed as regional chair for the Eastern Cape, then from 2000 became its regional secretary. He also held posts in the South African Communist Party and the African National Congress. He's now the general secretary of the Socialist Revolutionary Workers Party (South Africa).

In 2008, Jim was elected as the general secretary of NUMSA, the biggest single trade union in South Africa. He was the spokesperson for NUMSA when it was expelled from the Congress of South African Trade Unions (COSATU) in November 2014. He is a strong critic of the ruling African National Congress, which he accuses of failing to implement the 1955 Freedom Charter, and which he blames for xenophobic violence in South Africa.

In January 2015, he toured the United States, speaking to Local 1199 of the Service Employees International Union in New York, and the Institute for Policy Studies in Washington, DC. In his Washington speech, he stated that NUMSA is a Marxist-Leninist union whose goal is the creation of a "Socialist Republic of South Africa". He accused some leaders of the ANC of supporting a "post Apartheid neoliberal capitalist South Africa with South African and multinational corporations and the South African white political community" and stated that they had "betrayed the South African revolution."

He is cooperating with Mosiuoa Lekota of the Congress of the People party, and ousted COSATU general secretary Zwelinzima Vavi in a campaign against political corruption in South Africa.

Trade union offices
Preceded by Silumko Nondwangu	General Secretary of the National Union of Metalworkers of South Africa; 2008–present	Succeeded by Incumbent
