= Food and Allied Workers Union =

Trade union in South Africa

FAWU
- Food and Allied Workers Union
- Founded: 1986
- Headquarters: Cape Town, South Africa
- Location: South Africa
- Members: 85,000
- Key people: Atwell Nazo, President; Mayoyo Mngomezulu, General Secretary
- Affiliations: SAFTU
- Website: www.fawu.org.za

The Food and Allied Workers Union (FAWU) is a trade union representing workers in the food processing industry in South Africa.

The union was formed in 1986, through the amalgamation of the Food and Canning Workers' Union, the Sweet, Food and Allied Workers' Union and the Retail and Allied Workers' Union. In 2004, the union absorbed the South African Agricultural Plantation and Allied Workers Union.

The union was long affiliated with the Congress of South African Trade Unions, but it resigned in 2016, in protest at the expulsion of the National Union of Metalworkers of South Africa (NUMSA). In 2017, it was a founding affiliate of the South African Federation of Trade Unions (SAFTU), becoming that federation's second largest affiliate.

== Leadership ==
=== General Secretaries ===
1986: Mike Madlala
1986: Jan Theron
1988: Mandla Gxanyana
2004: Katishi Masemola
2020: Mayoyo Mngomezulu

=== Presidents ===
1986: Chris Dlamini
1990s: E. Theron
Phillip Khage
