= Olifantshoek, Limpopo =

Olifantshoek Holofani Xiphuphe
- Location within Limpopo Location within South Africa
- Coordinates: 23.340°S 30.277°E
- Country: South Africa
- Province: Limpopo
- District: Vhembe
- Municipality: Makhado

Government
  - Councillor: Chief Xigalo & Chief Khamanyani

Area
  - Total: 5.88 km^{2} (2.27 sq mi)

Population (2011)
  - Total: 5,976
  - Density: 1,020/km^{2} (2,630/sq mi)

Racial makeup (2011)
  - Black African: 99.9%
  - Indian/Asian: 0.1%

First languages (2011)
  - Tsonga: 97.3%
  - Other: 2.7%
- Time zone: UTC+2 (SAST)
- Postal code (street): 0930
- PO box: n/a
- Area code: 015 873

Olifantshoek is a village in Makhado Local Municipality in the Limpopo province of South Africa. Surrounded by Tiyani, Mamaila and Rotterdam villages, with the Ritavi River separating Olifantshoek, Dengeza, Noblehoek and others.

It was formerly under Mopani District Municipality but later demarcated to Vhembe District Municipality early in 2000. It is one of the poorest villages in the Makhado Municipality.
