= Black Allied Workers' Union =

South African trade union federation

The Black Allied Workers' Union (BAWU) was a national trade union federation in South Africa.

The federation was established on 27 August 1972, on the initiative of the South African Students' Organisation. It worked closely with the Black People's Convention, and was part of the Black Consciousness Movement. It argued for an independent trade union movement of and led by black workers. As such, it refused to work with the Trade Union Council of South Africa, which was led by white workers and had at times expelled unions of black workers, and while some members had links with the South African Congress of Trade Unions, BAWU's leadership disliked its non-racial approach.

Membership of BAWU's affiliated unions grew from 2,000 in 1974 to 6,000 in 1976, but then struggled as most of its leaders were banned in 1977. In 1978, many members in Durban and East London split to form the South African Allied Workers' Union. In 1980, the branches in Empangeni and Ladysmith split away to form the National Federation of Workers, followed by the Transvaal region, which became the General and Allied Workers' Union.

Despite the splits, BAWU claimed 51,000 members in 1981, organised in fifteen affiliates:

- Black Allied Air Railway Workers' Union
- Black Allied Building and Construction Workers' Union
- Black Allied Chemical and Petroleum Workers' Union
- Black Allied Electrical Workers' Union
- Black Allied Iron, Steel, Metal and Engineering Workers' Union
- Black Allied Meat Suppliers Workers' Union
- Black Allied Mines and Tunnel Workers' Union
- Black Allied Municipality Workers' Union
- Black Allied Nurses' Union
- Black Allied Rubber and Tyre Workers' Union
- Black Allied Shops and Offices Union
- Black Allied Sugar Cane Workers' Union
- Black Allied Teachers' Union
- Black Allied Transport and Goods Union
- Black Amalgamated Clothing and Textile Workers' Union

The federation moved into a loose alliance with the Inkatha Freedom Party, and in 1986 it was replaced by the United Workers' Union of South Africa.
