= National Federation of Workers =

Trade union federation in South Africa

The National Federation of Workers (NFW) was a national trade union federation in South Africa.

The federation was established in 1980, as a split from the Black Allied Workers' Union. Based in Durban, it was led by Matthew Oliphant and Themba Nxumalo, both of whom were also linked with the banned South African Congress of Trade Unions. By 1985, the federation had the following affiliates:

Union	Abbreviation	Membership (1985)
Brick, Clay and Allied Workers' Union	BRICKAWU	1,262
Cleaning Services and Allied Workers' Union	CSAWU	1,050
Commercial Distributive Workers' Union	CDWU	2,050
Health and Allied Workers' Union	HAWU	2,000
National Post Office and Allied Workers' Union	NAPAWU	3,900
National General Workers' Union and Retail and Allied Workers' Union	NGWU/RAWU	6,057
National Iron, Steel and Metal Workers' Union	NISMAWU	2,279

NISMAWU left the federation early in the year. In November 1985, the federation dissolved itself into the new Congress of South African Trade Unions, with NISMAWU also joining the new federation.
