= Trade Union Advisory Co-ordinating Council =

National trade union federation in South Africa

The Trade Union Advisory Co-ordinating Council (TUACC) was a national trade union federation in South Africa.

The General Factory Workers' Benefit Fund was established in 1972, as part of the Durban Moment. From 1973, it began launching trade unions, organised loosely from January 1974 as the "Trade Union Advisory Co-ordinating Council". The unions were organised on a factory basis, and aimed to be highly democratic, and open to all workers, regardless of race. They grew rapidly at first, and although they lost members later in the decade, they remained active.

The federation's affiliates were:

Union	Abbreviation	Founded
Chemical Workers' Industrial Union	CWIU	1974
Furniture and Timber Workers' Union		1974
Metal and Allied Workers' Union	MAWU	1974
National Union of Textile Workers	NUTW	1973
Transport and General Workers' Union	TGWU	1974

In 1974, the Industrial Aid Society was founded in the Witwatersrand, and this worked closely with TUACC, providing advisory services. In 1979, the majority of TUACC affiliates led the formation of the Federation of South African Trade Unions, and TUACC was dissolved.
