= South African Domestic Workers' Union =

Union

The South African Domestic Workers' Union (SADWU) was a trade union representing domestic staff in South Africa.

The union was founded in 1986, with the merger of the South African Domestic Workers' Association (SADWA), the East London Domestic Workers' Union, the Port Elizabeth Domestic Workers' Union, the National Domestic Workers Union, and the Domestic Workers' Union. Like SADWA, it affiliated to the Congress of South African Trade Unions, with 52,000 members.

Despite its size, the union struggled; it was not permitted to register as a union, and its members were not able to engage in official conciliation or collective bargaining. By 1993, it had shrunk to 16,172 members, and in 1998 it dissolved entirely.
