= National Union of Mineworkers (South Africa) =

South African trade union

NUM
- National Union of Mineworkers
- Founded: 1982; 44 years ago
- Founder: Cyril Ramaphosa
- Merger of: CAWU (2001); LIMUSA (2019)
- Location: South Africa
- Members: 170,000 (2025)
- Secretary General: Mpho Phakedi
- President: Phillip Vilakazi
- Affiliations: COSATU (nationally); IndustriALL (international)
- Website: www.num.org.za

The National Union of Mineworkers (NUM) is a Mining, Energy, Construction and Metal industry of South Africa related trade union, an organisation of workers with common goals through organised labour, in South Africa. With a membership of 170,000 as of 2025, it is an affiliate of the Congress of South African Trade Unions (COSATU).

== History ==
The union was founded in 1982 as a black mine workers union, on the initiative of the Council of Unions of South Africa. Its first leader was Cyril Ramaphosa, under whom it grew rapidly, winning bargaining recognition from the Chamber of Mines in 1983.

NUM campaigned successfully in the 1980s for the end of the job reservation system, a system which ensured that the best-paid jobs were allocated to whites. The union was a founding affiliate of the Congress of South African Trade Unions in 1985. In 2001, it absorbed the Construction and Allied Workers' Union, while in 2021 it absorbed the Liberated Metalworkers' Union of South Africa.The merger was completed in 2021.

NUM was affiliated internationally with the International Federation of Chemical, Energy, Mine and General Workers' Unions.

=== 2007 strike ===
On 4 December 2007, the Union went on strike to protest working conditions in South Africa's mines. The strike was spurred on by a rise in worker fatalities from 2006 to 2007, despite a government plan in October to reduce fatalities. Less than 5% of mineworkers came to work on that day.

=== 2012 wildcat strikes ===
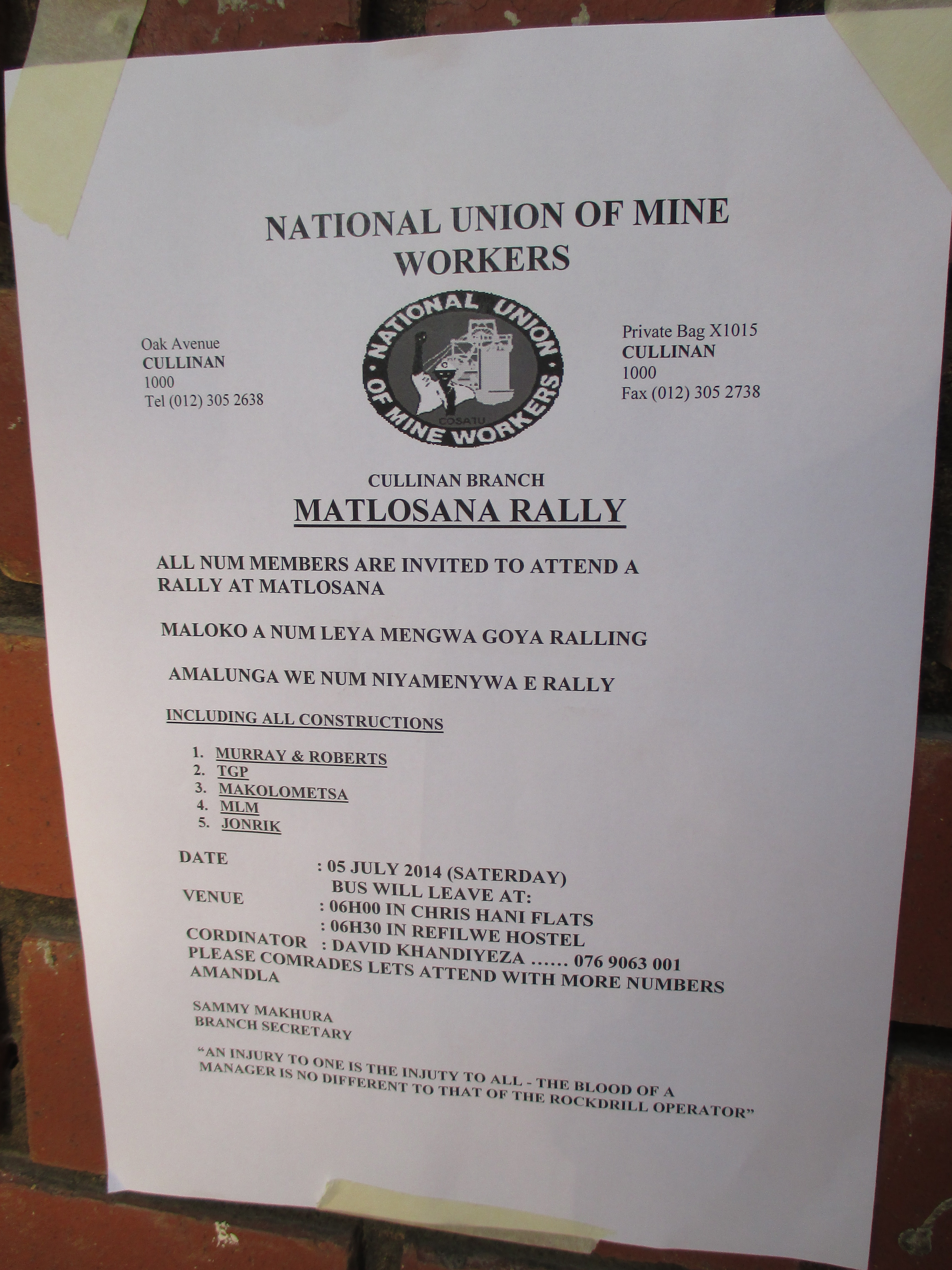
NUM leaflet calling for a general rally near Matlosana.

On 10 August 2012, thousands of NUM members began a series of wildcat strikes at Lonmin's Marikana mines linked to demands for increased pay. The following day, NUM leaders allegedly opened fire on striking NUM members who were marching to their offices to demand support from their union - an incident now acknowledge as the first violent incident during the strikes. It is said in the media that the killing of two striking miners was a central reason for the breakdown in trust within the union amongst workers. In a submission to the Farlam Commission, NUM has said that lethal force on this day was justified.

It is estimated that between 12 and 14 August about nine people (at least four miners, two police officers and two security guards) were killed in the area around Marikana - though there is conflicting reports on who killed whom during these dates.

On 16 August, police opened fire on a group of miners who had gathered on a hill near Nkaneng, at least 34 people were killed at Marikana, 78 were injured and 259 were arrested. The miners were carrying machetes and had refused a request to disarm. According to the Congress of South African Trade Unions, police had first used tear gas, water cannons and then used "live ammunition". The killings have been labelled a massacre throughout the media with police, Lonmin and NUM itself being blamed.

Revelations on the incident starting with academic investigations and then followed up by reporting by Greg Marinovich has shown that most of the killings happened off camera many minutes after some of the murders were recorded on television.

According to the New York Times, "Frans Baleni, general secretary of the National Union of Mineworkers, defended the police in an interview with Kaya FM, a radio station" saying that "The police were patient, but these people were extremely armed with dangerous weapons."

The shooting was one of the worst by the South African authorities since the end of the apartheid era in South Africa. Baleni and other NUM officials have also accused 'third forces' of being behind the Marikana strikes.

== Loss of support ==
It has been argued that there has been an exodus from NUM. According to Justice Malala, writing in The Guardian, "The NUM has lost all credibility and is bleeding members. Its already well-paid secretary, Baleni, was awarded a salary increase of more than 40% last year and his total salary package is just more than R105 000 a month. NUM leaders have refused to get out of police armoured vehicles to address workers." Others have also argued that NUM's membership numbers are inflated and, now, as a result of the strikes in the North West, its membership likely stands at around 150,000.

Others praised the organisation. An editorial in Business Day said "The NUM is the thoughtful, considered heart of the union movement here... It appreciates and values private capital and strong companies."

The rival union the Association of Mineworkers and Construction Union (AMCU) has increased in membership since the Marikana shootings and now represents over 40% of employees at Amplats and 70% at Lonmin.

== Leadership ==
=== General Secretaries ===
1982: Cyril Ramaphosa
1991: Kgalema Motlanthe
1998: Gwede Mantashe
2006: Frans Baleni
2015: David Sipunzi
2022: William Mabapa
2025: Mpho Phakedi

=== Presidents ===
1982: James Motlatsi
2000: Senzeni Zokwana
2014: Piet Matosa
2018: Joseph Montisetse
2022: Daniel Balepile
2025: Phillip Vilakazi
