= Creative Workers Union of South Africa =

Trade union in South Africa

CWUSA
- Creative Workers Union of South Africa
- Dissolved: 2014
- Location: South Africa
- Members: 500 (2014)
- Key people: Oupa Lebogo (general secretary)
- Affiliations: COSATU

The Creative Workers Union of South Africa (CWUSA) was a trade union in South Africa. It was affiliated with the Congress of South African Trade Unions (COSATU). Its registration with the Department of Labour was cancelled on 9 May 2014.
