= Cape Town Municipal Workers' Association =

Trade union in South Africa

The Cape Town Municipal Workers' Association (CTMWA) was a trade union representing local government workers in Cape Town, South Africa.

The union was founded in 1928 to represent "coloured" workers, and adopted a conservative approach, registering with the government. In 1964, the union was taken over by young organisers, active in the Non-European Unity Movement. They included long-term general secretary John Ernstzen. While they initially focused on limited, industrial, demands, by the 1970s the union was highly critical of apartheid and more politically active. It was also dominant in local government, representing 84% of unionised workers in Cape Town.

In the 1980s, the union supported student school boycotts, and was active in opposition to municipal housing privatisation and rent increases. In 1985, it became a founding affiliate of the Congress of South African Trade Unions, at which point it had 11,097 members. Two years later, it merged with the Municipal Workers' Union of South Africa and sections of other unions, to form the South African Municipal Workers' Union.
