= National Automobile and Allied Workers' Union =

Trade union in South Africa

Logo of the union

The National Automobile and Allied Workers' Union (NAAWU) was a trade union representing workers in the motor industry in South Africa.

NAAWU was founded in 1980, with the merger of the National Union of Motor Assembly and Rubber Workers of South Africa (NUMARW), the United Union of Automobile, Rubber and Allied Workers of South Africa, and the Western Province Motor Assembly Workers' Union. The union brought together about 12,000 members and, like all its predecessors, NAAWU affiliated to the Federation of South African Trade Unions (FOSATU). It was led by general secretary Fred Sauls. While its predecessors had been divided on colour lines, NAAWU was open to all workers in the industry.

NUMARW had been registered with the Government of South Africa as a trade union, and as its successor, NAAWU became one of the first non-racial trade unions able to register, the first within FOSATU. However, some workers argued that it was a mistake to register with the government, and so instead formed the rival Motor Assembly Component Workers' Union of South Africa.

By 1983, the union's membership had grown to 18,390, following a succession of strikes. In 1985, it transferred to FOSATU's successor, the Congress of South African Trade Unions. In 1987, it merged with the Metal and Allied Workers' Union, the Motor Industry Combined Workers' Union and United Metal, Mining and Allied Workers of South Africa, to form the National Union of Metalworkers of South Africa.
