= Federation of South African Trade Unions =

Trade union federation in South Africa

FOSATU
- Federation of South African Trade Unions
- Merged into: COSATU
- Founded: 20 April 1979
- Dissolved: 1 December 1985
- Location: South Africa

The Federation of South African Trade Unions (FOSATU) was a trade union federation in South Africa.

== History ==
The federation was formed at a congress over the weekend of 14–15 April 1979 in Hammanskraal and officially launched five days later on 20 April. Its roots lay in the unions which had emerged from the spontaneous 1973 strike wave by black workers in Durban and Pinetown as part of the "Durban Moment", and which had since been part of the Trade Union Advisory Co-ordinating Council or the Black Consultative Committee.

FOSATU's constitution enshrined the principles of workers' control of their trade unions, non-racialism, worker independence from party politics, international worker solidarity and trade union unity. It strove to build a tight national federation to work towards an industrial workers' bloc firmly based in strong grassroots organisation on the factory floor. It became the first truly national non-racial trade union federation in South African history, building unity and avoiding the regionalism which had pervaded earlier attempts at such an organisation. Its success here has been attributed to the fostering of a national leadership layer of "organic intellectuals" through a strong focus on the political education of shop stewards, and tight integration of the national, provincial and local structures of the organisation.

While the unions affiliated primarily organised black workers, their leadership, and that of FOSATU, was mixed, and included white activists in some prominent positions. As the Government of South Africa legalised multi-racial unions in 1979, FOSATU's affiliates decided to register. However, despite applying for multi-racial status, the government issued six of the unions with certificates which only permitted the organisation of black workers. FOSATU successfully challenged this, and the number of non-black members gradually increased.

FOSATU argued for its affiliates to become industrial unions, merging so that there was only one representing workers in each industry. This led to a number of mergers, most significantly in 1980 when several unions formed the new National Automobile and Allied Workers' Union. By 1983, the federation represented workers at 489 factories, and had a total of 285 agreements with employers.

The federation initially opposed industrial councils, arguing that they moved unions away from plant-based negotiations, and often compelled affiliates to renounce the right to strike. From 1982, it permitted affiliates to join industrial councils, although in some cases they faced strong opposition from rival unions. The right to strike was important, and for example, in 1983, its affiliates took part in 124 work stoppages, more than one-third of the total number of strikes across the country. It also organised consumer boycotts where a major employer would not negotiate, such as at Colgate-Palmolive in 1981.

As part of its commitment to trade union unity, FOSATU was prepared to disband its structures if wider unity could be attained. On 1 December 1985, following four years of unity talks between competing trade union federations, FOSATU upheld this pledge by dissolving into the newly formed Congress of South African Trade Unions (COSATU).

== Affiliates ==
Union	Abbreviation	Founded	Left	Reason for leaving	Membership (1980)	Membership (1983)
Chemical Workers' Industrial Union	CWIU	1974	1985	Transferred to COSATU	3,000	6,260
Eastern Province Sweet, Food and Allied Workers' Union	EPSFAWU	1977	1982	Merged into SFAWU	200	N/A
Engineering and Allied Workers' Union	EAWUSA	1963	1982	Expelled	3,000	N/A
Glass and Allied Workers' Union	GAWU	1973	1983	Merged into CWIU	1,300	N/A
Jewellers' and Goldsmiths' Union	JGU	1939	1985	Became independent	460	476
Metal and Allied Workers' Union	MAWU	1973	1985	Transferred to COSATU	8,400	20,050
Natal Sugar Industry Employees' Union	NSIEU	1937	1984	Expelled	N/A	1,000
National Automobile and Allied Workers' Union	NAAWU	1980	1985	Transferred to COSATU	N/A	18,390
National Union of Motor Assembly and Rubber Workers of South Africa	NUMARWOSA	1967	1980	Merged into NAAWU	4,500	N/A
National Union of Textile Workers	NUTW	1973	1985	Transferred to COSATU	8,300	13,150
Paper, Wood and Allied Workers' Union	PWAWU	1974	1985	Transferred to COSATU	3,000	5,030
Sweet, Food and Allied Workers' Union	SFAWU	1974	1985	Transferred to COSATU	2,000	10,150
Transport and General Workers' Union	TGWU	1973	1985	Transferred to COSATU	4,500	6,335
United Union of Automobile, Rubber and Allied Workers of South Africa	UAW	1973	1980	Merged into NAAWU	4,000	N/A
Western Province Motor Assembly Workers' Union	WPMAWU	1963	1980	Merged into NAAWU	1,250	N/A

== Leadership ==
=== General Secretaries ===
1979: Alec Erwin
1983: Joe Foster

=== Presidents ===
1979: John Mke
1982: Chris Dlamini

== See also ==
- Industrial and Commercial Workers' Union
- Internal resistance to South African apartheid
- Trade unions in South Africa
