= General and Allied Workers' Union =

Trade union in South Africa

The General and Allied Workers' Union (GAWU) was a general union in South Africa.

== Background ==
The union originated as the Transvaal section of the Black Allied Workers' Union. In 1980, Rita Ndzanga and Mary Ntsike led a split which resulted in the formation of GAWU. It formed as a non-racial union. Its members were made up of people from the brush and copper industries, mining house office workers, cleaners, scooter drivers, and petrol and transport workers. Numerous local South African Congress of Trade Unions activists also joined, including Samson Ndou, Ephraim Shabangu, Samuel Pholoto and Sydney Mufamadi.

By 1985, the union had 19,076 members. That year, it was a founding affiliate of the Congress of South African Trade Unions. In 1987, it merged with the Health and Allied Workers' Union and the South African Allied Workers' Union, to form the National Education, Health and Allied Workers' Union.
