= South African Allied Workers' Union =

Trade union in South Africa

The South African Allied Workers' Union (SAAWU) was a general union in South Africa.

== Background ==
The union was founded in 1978 as a split from the Black Allied Workers' Union by workers in Durban. The executives of the BAWU were expelled and the members reconstituted themselves into a new union. It described itself as a federation, with a union in each industry, but this structure was never properly developed, and it was generally viewed as being a single union. By 1980, it had 75,034 members. In that year to, its headquarters had moved from Durban to East London. In 1981, the union had organised itself into divisions unionising labour in the chemical, sweets, beverage, transport, and other industries. It also convinced the National Federation of Black Workers and its twenty-six affiliates to join its federation in 1981.

The union refused to register with the Government of South Africa as required by the Labour Relations Act. It quickly developed strength in East London, where it recruited both employed and unemployed workers. By 1982, most of its leadership had been detained by the country's security forces, including general secretary Sam Kikine. Its remaining leaders fell into conflict with one another, and the union declined. In 1985, it was a founding affiliate of the Congress of South African Trade Unions, and in 1987 it merged with the Health and Allied Workers' Union and the General and Allied Workers' Union, to form the National Education, Health and Allied Workers' Union.
