= National Union of Metalworkers of South Africa =

Trade union in South Africa

NUMSA
- National Union of Metalworkers of South Africa
- Founded: 1987
- Headquarters: Johannesburg, South Africa
- Location: South Africa
- Members: >338,000 (2013)
- Key people: Andrew Chirwa, president Irvin Jim, general secretary
- Affiliations: SAFTU
- Website: www.numsa.org.za

The National Union of Metalworkers of South Africa (NUMSA) is the biggest single trade union in South Africa with more than 338,000 members, and prior to its expulsion on 8 November 2014, the largest affiliate of the Congress of South African Trade Unions (COSATU), the country's largest trade union federation.

== History ==
NUMSA was founded in May 1987, with the merger of four unions:

- Metal and Allied Workers' Union
- Motor Industry Combined Workers' Union
- National Automobile and Allied Workers' Union
- United Metal, Mining and Allied Workers of South Africa

The General and Allied Workers' Union and the Transport and General Workers' Union, both affiliated to COSATU, also transferred their members in relevant industries.

The union considers itself to be Marxist-Leninist, and has had a fraught relationship with the South African Communist Party (SACP), which it considers to be no longer adhering to Marxist-Leninist principles. Post-1994, NUMSA became known within the Tripartite Alliance between COSATU, the SACP and the ruling African National Congress (ANC) for its refusal to remain silent on controversial ANC policies, especially its promotion of privatisation and its failure to end mass poverty in the country.

As of 2013, the union has over 340,000 members throughout South Africa.

=== Rejection of ANC and SACP ===
At the conclusion on 20 December 2013 of a special national congress held in Boksburg, NUMSA withdrew support from the ANC and SACP altogether, and called for an alternative movement of the working class. The union stated that it would not endorse any political party in the 2014 South African general election, but that individual members were free to campaign for the party of their choice, provided they do so in their own time using their own resources. It called for COSATU to break from the Tripartite Alliance and form a united front of left-wing forces similar to the United Democratic Front (UDF) during the struggle against Apartheid. As part of this, it called a conference for 2014 to explore the possibility of establishing a new workers' socialist party. NUMSA remained a COSATU affiliate until 8 November 2014, although it resolved to cease its R800 000 monthly subscription fee payments to the federation. In December, 2013 the union also said it would also stop paying contributions to the South African Communist Party (SACP). Up until that time they had been paying the SACP R1-million a year. It issued a call for the resignation of Jacob Zuma as President of South Africa.

=== Rejection of the EFF ===
The union also distanced itself from Julius Malema and his Economic Freedom Fighters citing concerns about corruption, authoritarianism and a limited conception of anti-capitalism.

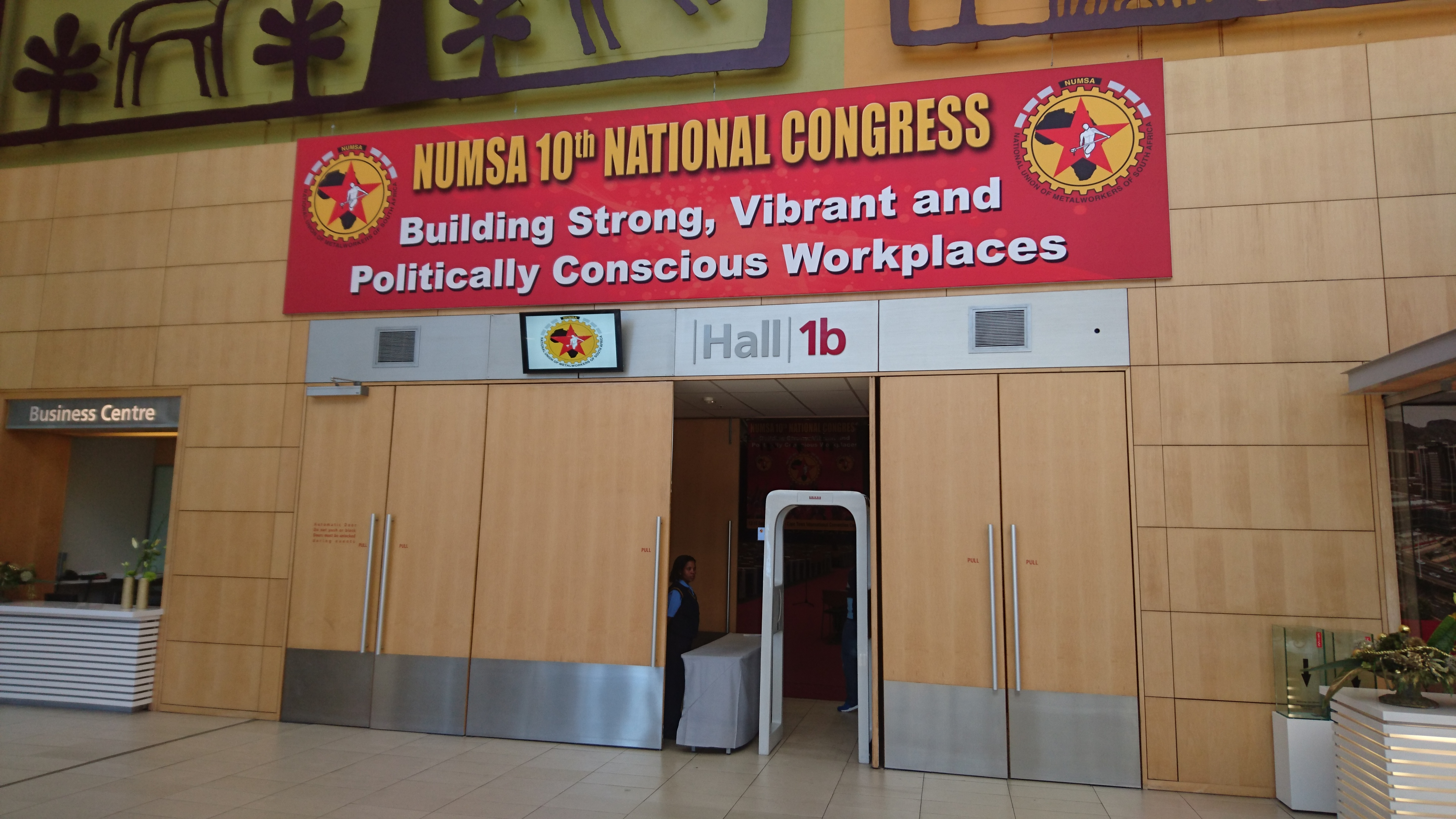
The entrance to the 10th National Congress meeting of NUMSA in 2016.

=== Expulsion from COSATU ===
In the early hours of the morning of 8 November 2014, after an "excruciating" 15-hour debate, the delegates of COSATU's Central Executive Committee (CEC) voted 33–24 in favour of expelling NUMSA from the trade union federation. After the vote was announced, a row occurred when COSATU president Sdumo Dlamini told the NUMSA CEC delegates to leave the meeting, but general secretary Zwelinzima Vavi intervened, citing the COSATU constitution to argue NUMSA would need to be informed in writing of its expulsion before it became valid. This did not calm matters, with both sides becoming ever more frustrated until the NUMSA delegates walked out and NUMSA secretary general Irvin Jim announced the union's expulsion to journalists waiting outside COSATU House. The meeting was adjourned shortly after without the remaining items on the agenda having been discussed.

=== Proposal to Return to Cosatu, the SACP and the ANC ===
In December 2025, Business Day reported that NUMSA was engaged in discussions with COSATU with a view to returning to the ANC-led tripartite alliance. The report stated that proposals circulated within NUMSA also included the convening of a meeting involving the ANC, SACP, EFF, MKP and Mayibuye Movement with the aim of building unity.

SAFTU rejected what it described as a “dishonest ‘come back home’ narrative”, stating that claims about a return to COSATU falsely suggested organisational continuity and ignored the circumstances under which SAFTU was formed following NUMSA’s expulsion from COSATU.

== Industrial actions ==
On 5 October 2021, NUMSA went on strike, seeking wage increases for its members in the auto industry sector, after talks with employer organisations had stalled. South African plants manufacture for major brands including Ford, BMW and Nissan. On 21 October, NUMSA secured 5-6% annual pay increases for its members, and ended the strike.

== Leadership ==
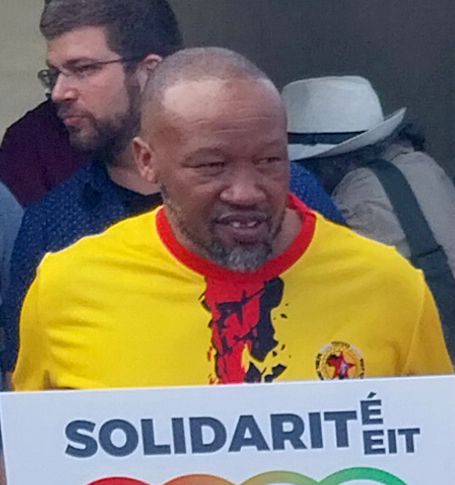
Irvin Jim has been NUMSA's general secretary since 2008.

=== General Secretaries ===
1987: Moses Mayekiso
1993: Enoch Godongwana
1996: Mbuyiselo Ngwenda
1999: Peter Dantjie (acting)
2000: Silumko Nondwangu
2008: Irvin Jim

=== Presidents ===
1987: Daniel Dube
1991: Maxwell Xulu
1992: Mthuthuzeli Tom
2008: Cedric Gina
2013: Andrew Nditshe Chirwa
