= Transport and General Workers' Union (South Africa) =

Trade union in South Africa

Logo of the union

The Transport and General Workers' Union (TGWU) was a trade union representing transport workers, and at times workers in other sectors, in South Africa.

The union was founded in 1973, inspired by the PUTCO workers' strike in Transvaal the previous year. It set up headquarters in Johannesburg, but represented workers in Transvaal, Natal and the Eastern Cape. The majority of its members worked in passenger and good transport, but it also had significant membership in hospitals, cleaning, security and cement, in addition to municipal workers in all sectors.

In 1974, the union affiliated to the Trade Union Advisory Co-ordinating Council, and in 1979 it was a founding affiliate of the Federation of South African Trade Unions (FOSATU). Its membership varied from 44,500 in 1977, down to only 4,500 in 1980, but back up to 18,281 in 1986. In 1985, it transferred to FOSATU's successor, the Congress of South African Trade Unions. The following year it absorbed the rival General Workers' Union, along with three small unions: the Amalgamated Cleaners' Union of South Africa, Cleaning Services and Allied Workers' Union, and South African Scooter Transport and Allied Workers' Union. Refocused on transport, cleaning and security, its other members were gradually transferred to other unions; for example, those in metalworking and engineering moved to the National Union of Metalworkers of South Africa in 1987.

In the late 1990s, the TGWU began negotiations on a merger with the South African Railways and Harbours Union; by this point, the TGWU had about 50,000 members. The merger was finally completed on 18 May 2000, forming the South African Transport and Allied Workers Union.

== General Secretaries ==
1970s: Isobel Shongwe
1985: Jane Barratt
1989: Nkosinathi Nhleko
1994: Randall Howard
