= Congress of South African Trade Unions =

South African trade union federation

COSATU
- Congress of South African Trade Unions
- Founded: 30 November 1985; 40 years ago
- Headquarters: Cosatu House; 110 Jorissen Street; Johannesburg; Gauteng
- Location: South Africa
- Members: 2,193,965
- Key people: Zingiswa Losi, General Secretary; Mike Shingange, President
- Affiliations: ITUC; WFTU; ICFTU-AFRO
- Website: www.cosatu.org.za

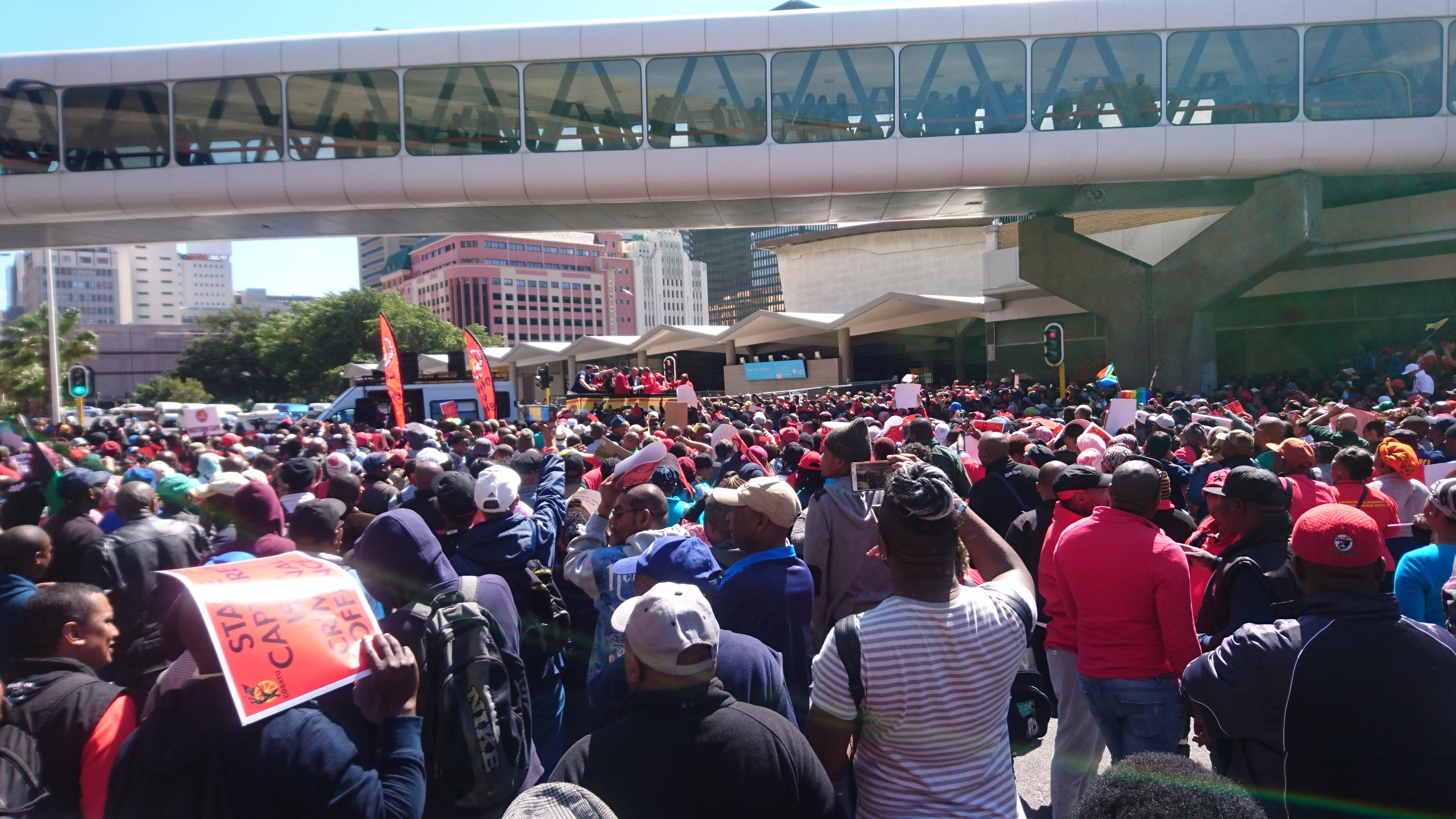
A COSATU organised protest in Cape Town calling for an end to state capture and for the prosecution of those involved in the administration of President Jacob Zuma.

The Congress of South African Trade Unions (COSATU or Cosatu) is a trade union federation in South Africa. It was founded in 1985 and is the largest of the country's three main trade union federations, with 21 affiliated trade unions. (Note: One Union expelled, and seven Unions voluntarily suspended their participation in COSATU)

== History ==
=== Founding and early history ===
On 30 November 1985, 33 unions met at the University of Natal for talks on forming a federation of trade unions. This followed four years of unity talks between competing unions and federations that were opposed to apartheid and were "committed to a non-racial, non-sexist and democratic South Africa." COSATU was officially established on 1 December 1985. Among the founding unions were the affiliates of the Federation of South African Trade Unions (FOSATU), the small National Federation of Workers, and some independent unions, notably the National Union of Mineworkers. Elijah Barayi was the organisation's first president and Jay Naidoo the first general secretary.

Several resolutions were passed at this first meeting that defined the aim of the federation and how the federation operates, namely:

- To establish one union for each industry within six months.
- To focus on the exploitation of women workers.
- To call for the lifting of the state of emergency, withdrawal of troops from the townships and release of all political prisoners.
- To continue the call for international pressure, including disinvestment.
- To demand for the right to strike and picket.
- To determine a national minimum wage.
- To extend the struggle for trade union rights in the homelands.

On 5–6 May 1987 a strike as part of COSATU's Living Wage Campaign was held coinciding with 1987 General Election. More than 2.5 million workers took part in the stay-away. On 7 May 1987, in the early hours of the morning two bombs exploded near the support columns in the basement of the federation headquarters, COSATU House. The resulting damage caused the building to be declared unsafe.

=== Fight against Apartheid ===
At the second national congress held from 14 to 18 July 1987, the Freedom Charter was adopted by the federation after the resolution was proposed by the National Union of Mineworkers

At the third congress held from 12 to 16 July 1989, a resolution was adopted that called on the members of COSATU to join a campaign of "sustained action" against apartheid, in the week leading up to the 1989 General Election of South Africa.

On 26 July 1989, COSATU, the United Democratic Front and the Mass Democratic Movement, instigated the National Defiance Campaign, in which facilities reserved for whites were invaded, and organisation that had been banned by the state declared themselves 'unbanned'.

=== Post apartheid activities ===
The COSATU congress decided in 2012 to affiliate with the class-struggle oriented World Federation of Trade Unions, while maintaining its membership within the International Trade Union Confederation.

During the 2016 Congress that was held in Durban, Michael Mzwandile Makwayiba, president of COSATU affiliate NEHAWU Michael Mzwandile Makwayiba was elected President of the World Federation of Trade Unions.

By 2012 the trade union had a total of 2,191,016 members and 20 affiliated unions. Since then Cosatu experienced a large drop in membership partially due to a decline in affiliate membership numbers, between 2015 and 2022 it lost over 416 000 members.

== Affiliates ==
=== Current affiliates ===
In 2021 the following unions were listed by COSATU as affiliates:

Union	Abbreviation	Founded	Membership (2014)
Agricultural Food and Allied Democratic Workers Union	AFADWU	2016	N/A
Chemical, Energy, Paper, Printing, Wood and Allied Workers' Union	CEPPWAWU	1999	80,331
Communication Workers Union	CWU	1999	22,007
Democratic Nursing Organisation of South Africa	DENOSA	1996	81,319
National Education, Health and Allied Workers' Union	NEHAWU	1987	277,317
National Union of Mineworkers	NUM	1982	270,649
Police and Prisons Civil Rights Union	POPCRU	1989	149,339
Public and Allied Workers Union of South Africa	PAWUSA	1967	17,146
South African Commercial, Catering and Allied Workers Union	SACCAWU	1975	120,352
Southern African Clothing and Textile Workers Union	SACTWU	1989	85,000
South African Democratic Teachers Union	SADTU	1990	253,039
South African Emergency Personnel's Union	SAEPU	2006	N/A
South African Medical Association Trade Union	SAMATU	1998	8,166
South African Municipal Workers' Union	SAMWU	1987	161,490
SASBO – The Finance Union	SASBO	1916	66,539
South African Transport and Allied Workers Union	SATAWU	2000	152,254

=== Former affiliates ===
Union	Abbreviation	Founded	Left	Reason not affiliated	Membership (1985)	Membership (1993)
Amalgamated Black Workers' Union	ABWU	1984	1986	Merged into TGWU	1,000	N/A
Amalgamated Clothing and Textile Workers' Union of South Africa	ACTWUSA	1987	1989	Merged into SACTWU	N/A	N/A
Brick, Clay and Allied Workers' Union	BRICKAWU		1987	Merged into CAWU	748	N/A
Cape Town Municipal Workers' Association	CTMWA	1928	1987	Merged into SAMWU	11,097	N/A
Chemical Workers' Industrial Union	CWIU	1974	1999	Merged into CEPPWAWU	20,700	41,462
Cleaning Services and Allied Workers' Union	CSAWU			Merged into TGWU	850	N/A
Commercial and Distributive Workers' Union	CDWU				1,600	N/A
Construction and Allied Workers' Union	CAWU	1987	2001	Merged into NUM	N/A	24,300
Food and Allied Workers Union	FAWU	1986	2016	Disaffiliated	N/A	121,534
Food and Canning Workers' Union	FCWU	1941	1986	Merged into FAWU	26,455	N/A
General and Allied Workers' Union	GAWU	1980	1987	Merged into NEHAWU	19,076	N/A
General Workers' Union	GWU	1977	1986	Merged into TGWU	20,000	N/A
General Workers' Union of South Africa	GWUSA	1981	1987	Dissolved	2,905	N/A
Health and Allied Workers' Union	HAWU		1987	Merged into NEHAWU	1,111	N/A
Hotel and Restaurant Workers' Union	HARWU	1926	1990	Merged into SACCAWU		N/A
Institute of Public Servants	IPS				N/A	N/A
Liberated Metalworkers' Union of South Africa	LIMUSA	2015	2021	Merged into NUM	N/A	N/A
Metal and Allied Workers' Union	MAWU	1973	1987	Merged into NUMSA	38,789	N/A
Motor Assembly and Component Workers' Union of South Africa	MACWUSA	1982	1987	Merged into NUMSA	3,100	N/A
Municipal Workers' Union of South Africa	MWUSA	1982	1987	Merged into SAMWU	9,249	N/A
Musicians Union of South Africa	MUSA	1994	2014	Merged into CWUSA	N/A	N/A
National Automobile and Allied Workers' Union	NAAWU	1980	1987	Merged into NUMSA	20,338	N/A
National General Workers' Union of South Africa	NGWUSA	1984			6,037	N/A
National Iron, Steel and Metal Workers' Union	NISMAWU	1980	1986	Merged into MAWU	976	N/A
National Post Office and Allied Workers' Union	NAPAWU				2,163	N/A
National Unemployed Workers Co-ordinating Committee	NUWCC	1987	1991	Dissolved	N/A	N/A
National Union of Metalworkers of South Africa	NUMSA	1987	2014	Expelled	100,000	253,796
National Union of Printers and Allied Workers	NUPAWO	1984	1987	Merged into PPWAWU		N/A
National Union of Textile Workers	NUTW	1973	1987	Merged into ACTWUSA	23,241	N/A
Paper, Printing, Wood and Allied Workers' Union	PPWAWU	1974	1999	Merged into CEPPWAWU	11,856	37,951
Performing Arts Workers' Equity	PAWE		2014	Merged into CWUSA	N/A	N/A
Post and Telecommunication Workers' Association	POTWA	1986	1996	Merged into CWU	N/A	23,081
Retail and Allied Workers' Union	RAWU	1984	1986	Merged into FAWU	3,830	N/A
South African Agricultural Plantation and Allied Workers Union	SAAPAWU	1995	2004	Merged into FAWU	N/A	N/A
South African Allied Workers' Union	SAAWU	1978	1987	Merged into NEHAWU	25,032	N/A
South African Domestic Workers' Association	SADWA	1981	1986	Merged into SADWU	4,500	N/A
South African Domestic Workers' Union	SADWU	1986	1998	Dissolved	N/A	16,172
South African Football Players Union	SAFPU	1997	2016	Disaffiliated	N/A	N/A
South African Mineworkers' Union	SAMWU	1983	1987	Dissolved	3,029	N/A
South African Railways and Harbours Union	SARHWU	1936	2000	Merged into SATAWU	8,220	41,081
South African Scooter Transport and Allied Workers' Union	SASTAWU	1981	1986	Merged into TGWU	4,700	N/A
South African State and Allied Workers' Union	SASAWU	2000	2015	Disaffiliated	N/A	N/A
South African Textile and Allied Workers' Union	SATAWU	1984	1988	Merged into GAWU	1,900	N/A
South African Tin Workers' Union	SATWU	1937			581	N/A
Sweet, Food and Allied Workers' Union	SFAWU	1974	1986	Merged into FAWU	19,596	N/A
Transport and General Workers' Union	TGWU	1973	2000	Merged into SATAWU	11,000	38,036
United Mining, Metal and Allied Workers of South Africa	UMMAWOSA	1983	1987	Merged into NUMSA	8,335	N/A

== Expulsion of the National Union of Metalworkers of South Africa ==
On 8 November 2014, Irvin Jim, the general secretary of the largest COSATU affiliate, the National Union of Metalworkers of South Africa (NUMSA), announced that the union had been expelled from the COSATU after a vote at a special central executive committee had been convened resulting in a 33–24 vote in favour of the expulsion. NUMSA was charged with violating the constitution of COSATU

On 6 November 2014, an urgent legal application by NUMSA to prevent the special central executive committee from being convened was postponed by South Gauteng High Court, thus allowing the meeting to take place.

On 10 November 2014, 7 unions announced they were voluntarily suspending their participation in COSATU's decision-making bodies due to the expulsion of NUMSA and called for a special national congress to be convened.

Irvin Jim described the expulsion as "a dark day for workers".

== Government ==
COSATU is part of an alliance with the ANC and the South African Communist Party, called the "Tripartite Alliance". COSATU's role in the alliance has been the subject of debate, since the organisation has been critical of some of the ANC government's policies. While some affiliates have argued for greater independence from the ruling political party, others have argued that the arrangement gives COSATU a political influence beneficial to its members."

== Labour and social movements ==
South Africa has one of the largest incidence of HIV/AIDS in the world, with a 2005 estimate of 5.5-million people living with HIV – 12.4% of the population. In 2020, around 20.6-million people in eastern and southern Africa were living with HIV. The trade union movement has taken a role in combating this pandemic. COSATU is a key partner in the Treatment Action Campaign (TAC), a registered charity and political force working to educate and promote understanding about HIV/AIDS, and to prevent new infections, as well as push for greater access to antiretrovirals. In 1998, COSATU passed a resolution to campaign for treatment. "It was clear to the labour movement at that time that its lowest paid members were dying because they couldn’t afford medicines", says Theodora Steel, Campaigns Coordinator at COSATU. "We saw TAC as a natural ally in a campaign for treatment. We passed a formal resolution at our congress to assist and build TAC.

Notwithstanding the formal alliance of COSATU with the ruling ANC party, it has been at odds with the government, calling for the roll-out of comprehensive public access to antiretroviral drugs.

Abahlali baseMjondolo offered a strong statement of support to the 2010 Public Sector Worker's strike.

== Logo ==
The wheel in the logo represents the economy. The gold colour of the wheel represents the wealth of the country. The figures pushing the wheel, consisting of two men and a woman carrying a baby, represent the challenges that workers face namely, racial and gender oppression as well as economic exploitation. These figures are black as they represent the black majorities struggle against racial oppression. The figures are holding a red flag that represents the working class.

The slogan on the logo is "An injury to one is an injury to all" signifies the vision the union has of social solidarity that binds the working class.

== Zimbabwe ==
In October 2004 and February 2005 COSATU sent delegations to Zimbabwe to judge conditions in that country before the 2005 Zimbabwe parliamentary elections. They were expelled from the country on both occasions.

COSATU has arranged protests and border blockades against the regime in Harare.

In 2016, COSATU voiced support for #ThisFlag protestors in Zimbabwe, stating "heavy-handedness of the Zanu-PF regime in dealing with perceived enemies was similar to that of Operation Restore Order/Murambatsvina in 2005."

== Palestine activism ==
In 2020, COSATU voiced their solidarity with Palestinian peoples on 15 May (Nakba Day) and have linked the Palestinian right to land to COSATU's struggle against apartheid in South Africa. In 2021 Palestinians protested against an Israeli court ruling which stated that residents of Sheik Jarrah need to be evicted from their homes in Jerusalem. Israeli troops attacked Al-Aqsa during Ramadan, a holy month for many Palestinians. COSATU marched to the US Embassy in Sandton, Johannesburg as a show of support for Palestinians, stating that the US government needs to recognise the sovereignty of Palestine as well as the gross human rights violations against Palestinians.

== Current officeholders ==
National Office Bearers:

- President: Mike Shingange
- First Deputy-President:
- Second Deputy-President: Duncan Luvuno
- Secretary General: Zingiswa Losi
- Deputy General Secretary: Gerald Twala
- Treasurer: Freda Oosthuysen

Provincial Secretaries:

- Eastern Cape: Mkhawuleli Maleki
- Free State: Tiisetso Mahlatsi
- Gauteng: Louisa Modikwe
- KwaZulu-Natal: Edwin Mkhize
- Limpopo: Hangwani Mashao
- Mpumalanga: Thabo Mokoena
- North West: Kabelo Kgoro
- Northern Cape: Orapeleng Moraladi
- Western Cape: Malvern de Bruyn

== See also ==
- Trade unions in South Africa
- 1973 Durban strikes
- 2007 South African public servants' strike
- Siphiwe Mvuyane
- John Gomomo
