= Urban Training Project =

Encourages South African workers to form new trade unions

The Urban Training Project (UTP) was an initiative to encourage black workers in South Africa to form new trade unions.

During the 1960s, the Trade Union Council of South Africa (TUCSA) had first permitted unions representing black workers to affiliate, then banned them, in response to a backlash from many of its white affiliates. Its African affairs section closed in 1969. Former officials of the section established the Urban Training Project in Johannesburg the following year, with the intention of educating black workers on trade unionism and works councils.

Numerous trade unions were created through the work of the project:

Union	Abbreviation	Founded
Building, Construction and Allied Workers' Union	BCAWU	1975
Commercial Catering and Allied Workers' Union of South Africa	CCAWUSA	1976
Glass and Allied Workers' Union	GAWU	1975
Laundry and Dry Cleaning Workers' Association	LDCWA	1972
National Union of Textile Workers	NUTW	1973
Paper, Wood and Allied Workers' Union	PWAWU	1974
South African Chemical Workers' Union	SACWU	1972
Sweet, Food and Allied Workers' Union	SFAWU	1974
United Automobile, Rubber and Allied Workers' Union	UAW	1975

In 1973, the affiliates founded the Black Consultative Committee (BCC), as a loose federation. This began working closely with TUCSA, and led rival unions to accuse the BCC unions of not being truly independent.

In 1979, some of the committee's affiliates joined the new Federation of South African Trade Unions, leading to their expulsion from the group. Most of the remaining unions took part in the formation of the Council of Unions of South Africa on 14 September 1980.
