= Order of the Disa =

The Order of the Disa is a provincial-level order issued by the Department of the Premier of Western Cape Province in South Africa. It was created by the Provincial Honours Act 9 of 1999, and is enshrined in Section 6 (1) of the Western Cape Provincial Constitution. It is awarded in the following three levels:

- Commander: for rendering excellent meritorious service
- Officer: for rendering outstanding meritorious service
- Member: for rendering noteworthy meritorious service.

It was first awarded in 2003 by then-premier Marthinus van Schalkwyk at Castle of Good Hope, and has been awarded intermittently ever since.

== List of honorees ==
=== 2007 ===
1. Helen Suzman – Commander
2. Basil February – Commander
3. James Arnold la Guma – Commander
4. Clements Kadalie – Commander
5. Dulcie September – Commander
6. Jack Simons – Commander
7. Nana Abrahams – Officer
8. Reverend Michael Lapsley SSM – Officer
9. Reginald September – Officer
10. Elizabeth Mafikeng – Officer
11. Anna Berry – Officer
12. Dora Tamana – Officer
13. John James Issel – Officer
14. Alex La Guma – Officer, Posthumous
15. Sir Richard Edmonds Luyt – Officer, Posthumous
16. Molly Blackburn – Officer, Posthumous
17. Hilda Bernstein – Officer, Posthumous
18. Gaby Shapiro – Officer, Posthumous
19. Autshumao “Harry de Strandloper” – Officer, Posthumous
20. Sarah Baartman – Officer, Posthumous
21. Cheryl Carolus – Officer
22. Solomon Makosana – Officer, Posthumous
23. Archbishop Njongonkulu Ndungane – Officer
24. Tony Links – Officer, Posthumous
25. Izak L. de Villiers – Officer
26. Leonora van den Heever – Officer
27. Patricia Gorvalla – Officer
28. Pamela Golding – Officer
29. Osma Mbombo – Officer
30. Ronald Herbolt – Officer, Posthumous
31. Richard Ishmail – Member, Posthumous
32. Evelina Tshabalala – Member
33. Zikiswa Matamo – Member
34. Nomawethu Nika – Member
35. Taswell Papier – Member
36. Iris Barry – Member, Posthumous
37. Ronald Harrison – Member
38. Fred Carneson – Member, Posthumous
39. Sarah Carneson – Member
40. Anneline Rabie – Member
41. Mbuyiselo Sodayise – Member, Posthumous
42. Johanna Barnes – Member
43. Helena Marincowitz – Member, Posthumous
44. Jacob du Plessis – Member
45. Isaac David Morkel – Member, Posthumous
46. Rev. Martin Jack Reginald Wessels – Member, Posthumous
47. Imam Armien Baker – Member, Posthumous
48. Lutz Christian van Dijk – Member
49. Lucas Janse van Rensburg – Member
50. Michael Shand – Member
51. Jarl Are Hovstad – Member
52. David Walter Patrick – Member, Posthumous
53. Sheik Abdul Hamid Gabier – Member

=== 2006 ===
1. Molefi Nathanael Oliphant – Officer
2. Dr Irvin Khoza – Officer
3. Daniel (Danny) Alexander Jordaan – Officer

=== 2005 ===
1. Nelson Mandela – Commander
2. Archbishop Desmond Tutu – Commander
3. Dr. Abdullah Abdulrahman (posthumous) – Officer
4. Dr. Neville Alexander – Officer
5. Ray Alexander Simons – Officer
6. Dr. Allan Boesak – Officer
7. Brian Bunting – Officer
8. Dr. Danie Craven (posthumous) – Officer
9. Richard Dudley – Officer
10. Colin Eglin – Officer
11. Prof. George Ellis – Officer
12. Imam Abdullah Haron (posthumous) – Officer
13. Hassan Howa – Officer
14. Prof. Willie Jonker – Officer
15. Philip Kgosana – Officer
16. Adv. Bennie Kies (professor) – Officer
17. Mildred Ramakaba-Lesiea – Officer
18. Zora Mehlomakulu – Officer
19. Sheikh Nazeem Mohamed – Officer
20. Judge Essa Moosa – Officer
21. Oscar Mpetha – Officer
22. Solwandle Ngudle (posthumous) – Officer
23. Jan Rabie (posthumous) – Officer
24. Dr. David Rabkin – Officer
25. Dr. Richard Rive – Officer
26. Rabbi Dr. David Sherman – Officer
27. Mark Shuttleworth – Officer
28. Annie Silinga – Officer
29. Prof. Adam Small – Officer
30. Christmas Tinto – Officer
31. Basil Coetzee (posthumous) – Officer
32. Archbishop Emeritus Joost de Blank – Officer
33. Robbie Jansen – Officer
34. Zollie Malindi – Officer
35. Winston Mankunku Ngozi – Officer
36. Reverend Sikolakhe Marawu – Officer
37. Dr. Anton Rupert – Officer
38. Zackie Achmat – Member
39. Imam Manie Bassier – Member
40. Mary Burton – Member
41. Cissie Gool – Member
42. Archbishop Lawrence Henry – Member
43. David Kramer – Member
44. Dr. Kwesi Madikiza – Member
45. Dorothy Mfaco – Member
46. Maxwell Moss – Member
47. Margaret Nash (posthumous) – Member
48. Madoda Ntilashe (posthumous) – Member
49. Reggie Olifant (posthumous) – Member
50. Taliep Petersen – Member
51. Vincent Qunta (posthumous) – Member
52. Dr. Hannah-Reeve Sanders – Member
53. Victor Ritchie – Member
54. Amy Thornton – Member
55. Ernst van Dyk – Member
56. Father Basil van Rensburg – Member

=== 2004 ===
1. Archbishop Desmond Tutu – Commander
2. Dr Abdullah Ibrahim – Officer
3. Antjie Krog – Officer
4. Mark Shuttleworth – Officer
5. Dr Franklin Sonn – Officer
6. Abdulah Mohamed Omar – Officer
7. Adam Small – Officer
8. Dr Mamphela Ramphele – Officer
9. Prof. Njabulo Ndebele – Officer
10. Helen Lieberman – Member
11. Pieter-Dirk Uys – Member
12. Chester Williams – Member
13. Willie Bester – Member
14. Prof. Lynette Denny – Member
15. Ian Douglas – Member
16. Dawn Hare – Member
17. Rashid Lombard – Member
18. Prof. Nomvula Mtetwa – Member
19. Ernst van Dyk – Member
20. David Samaai – Member
21. Millin Smith Petersen (posthumous) – Member
22. Dr Frank James Lloyd Quint (posthumous) – Member
23. Christiaan Jacobus Du Toit – (?)

=== 2003 ===
1. Archbishop Desmond Tutu – Commander
2. Raymond Ackerman – Officer
3. J. M. Coetzee – Officer
4. DP de Villiers (posthumous) – Officer
5. Jakes Gerwel – Officer
6. Adam Small – Officer
7. Frank Bradlow (posthumous) – Member
8. David Jack – Member
9. Helen Lieberman – Member
10. Mavis Nduzulwana – Member
11. Adele Seale – Member
12. Mark Shuttleworth – Member
13. Phyllis Spira – Member
14. Pieter-Dirk Uys – Member
15. Willem van Schalkwyk (posthumous) – Member
16. Chester Williams – Member

== See also ==
- Western Cape Golden Cross
