= Trade unions in South Africa =

- National organization(s): COSATU, FEDUSA, NACTU, CONSAWU, SAFTU
- Regulatory authority: Department of Labour; Commission for Conciliation, Mediation and Arbitration; National Economic Development and Labour Council
- Primary legislation: Labour Relations Act of 1995
- Total union membership: 3.8 million
- Density: ~30% of the formal workforce

Global Rights Index
- 3 Regular violations of rights

International Labour Organization
- South Africa is a member of the ILO

Convention ratification
- Freedom of Association: 19 February 1996; 30 years ago
- Right to Organise: 19 February 1996; 30 years ago

Trade unions in South Africa are a significant part of the South African labor market, with 3.8 million members represented by a union. This constitutes around 30% of the total formal workforce. South Africa has a robust system of labor rights legislation and processes, designed to protect its workers from unfair treatment, and unions play a role in representing workers in terms of those rights, as well as generally advocating on behalf of them.

The Congress of South African Trade Unions (COSATU) is the largest of the three major trade union centers, with a membership of around 2.2 million, and is part of the Tripartite alliance with the African National Congress (ANC) and the South African Communist Party (SACP).

Unionism in SA has a history dating back to the 1880s. From the beginning, unions could be viewed as a reflection of the then-racial disunity of the country, with the earliest unions being predominantly for white workers. Through the turbulent years of 1948–1991 trade unions played an important part in developing political and economic resistance, and eventually were one of the driving forces in realizing the transition to an inclusive democratic government.

== The history ==
Early trade unions were often for whites only, with organizations like the South African Confederation of Labour (SACoL) favouring employment policies based on racial discrimination. They also often did not fully accept women into the unions. Mary Fitzgerald is considered the first female South African trade unionist and who led many strikes and sit ins before 1911.

The first trade union to organise black workers was the Industrial Workers of Africa (IWA), formed in September 1917 by the revolutionary syndicalist International Socialist League (ISL). The IWA merged into the Industrial and Commercial Workers' Union of Africa (ICU), formed in 1919, in 1920.

The ICU was initially a union for black and coloured dockworkers in Cape Town and formed by Clements Kadalie and Arthur F. Batty. It was the first nationally organised union for black workers who would eventually include rural farm workers, domestic and factory workers, dockworkers, teachers and retailers. By the 1920s it was said to be more popular than the ANC and eventually had branches in the Free State, Transvaal and Natal and in 1925 it moved its headquarters to Johannesburg.

In 1924, the South African Trades Union Council (SATUC) was formed with 30,000 members of black trade unions with Bill Andrews as its secretary. It would attract black trade unions from the dry-cleaning, furniture, sweets and automobile industries.

By the 1930s the South African Trades and Labour Council (SATLC) had united much of the country. The SATLC maintained an explicitly non-racial stance, and accepted affiliation of black trade unions, as well as calling for full legal rights for black trade unionists. Some black unions joined SATLC, while in the 1940s others affiliated with the Council of Non-European Trade Unions, raising it to a peak of 119 unions and 158,000 members in 1945.

In 1946, the CNETU with the African National Congress and the South African Communist Party pushed for the African Mine Workers' Strike to become a General Strike. The strike was broken by the police brutality which was part of the rise of the National Party (NP) and their slogan of apartheid as all black trade unions were violently suppressed.

== 1954 – 1991 ==
By 1954 SATLC was disbanded, and with the formation of the Trade Union Council of South Africa (TUCSA) union membership included white, coloured, and Asians, with blacks in dependent organizations. Independent black unions were excluded from affiliation and 14 previous unions from SATLC founded the South African Congress of Trade Unions (SACTU). SACTU merged with the Council of Non-European Trade Unions and became the trade union arm of the ANC. The union grew to a membership of 53,000 by 1961, but was driven underground, and for a decade black unionism was again virtually silenced in South Africa.

In 1979 the Federation of South African Trade Unions (FOSATU) was formed, with the Council of Unions of South Africa (CUSA) being created in the following year.

What was to become one of the largest unions in South Africa, the National Union of Mineworkers (NUM) was created in 1982, and was deeply involved in the political conflict against the ruling National Party. The union embraced four "pillars" of action - armed struggle, mass mobilisation (ungovernability), international solidarity, and underground operation.

The Congress of South African Trade Unions (COSATU) was formed in 1985, and FOSATU merged into it in the same year (more formally known in the teaching industry).

The largest strike up to that date in South Africa's history took place on 1 May 1986, when 1.5 million black workers "stayed away" in a demand for recognition of an official May Day holiday. In the following June up to 200 trade union officials, including Elijah Barayi and Jay Naidoo of the COSATU, and Phiroshaw Camay, the general secretary of the CUSA, were reported to be arrested under a renewed state of emergency.

Also in 1986, CUSA joined with the Azanian Confederation of Trade Unions (AZACTU) to form the National Council of Trade Unions (NACTU), and Chief Mangosuthu Buthelezi created the United Workers' Union of South Africa (UWUSA), particularly to oppose disinvestment in South Africa. The UWUSA eventually faded from view, but not before revelations in July 1991 that it had collaborated with anti-union employers in a campaign against both COSATU and NACTU activists, and had received at least 1.5 million Rand from the security police.

In 1988 a new Labour Relations Act placed restrictions on labour activities, including giving the Labour Court the power to ban lawful strikes and lock-outs. This was to be short-lived, and negotiations between COSATU, NACTU and the South African Committee on Labour Affairs (SACOLA) eventually produced a 1991 amendment which effectively repealed the previous powers.

In 1990 SACTU, which had continued underground activities from exile, dissolved and advised its members to join COSATU. COSATU, as a member of the Tripartite alliance with the ANC and SACP, provided material support in the form of strikes and both political and economic unrest, which eventually led to the displacement of the National Party, and the majority victory of the ANC in the 1994 political elections.

== Today ==
Trade unions are recognised within the 1996 Constitution of South Africa, which provides for the right to join trade unions and for unions to bargain collectively and strike. That has translated into the Labour Relations Act, which established the working framework for both unions and employers.

Three institutions have also been created to further the goals of reducing industrial relations conflict, eliminating unfair discrimination and redressing past discrimination in the workplace: the National Economic Development and Labour Council (NEDLAC), the Labour Court and the Commission for Conciliation, Mediation and Arbitration (CCMA).

With the creation of the Federation of Unions of South Africa (FEDUSA) from the merger of the Federation of South African Labour Unions (FEDSAL) and several smaller unions in 1997, the three main union organizations were established. COSATU, with a membership of 1.8 million, is followed by FEDUSA with 560,000 members and NACTU with almost 400,000 members including the powerful mineworkers union. All three are affiliated with the International Trade Union Confederation.

A fourth national trade union centre was formed in 2003. The Confederation of South African Workers' Unions (CONSAWU) is affiliated with the World Confederation of Labour (WCL).

The 2006 ICFTU Annual Survey of violations of trade union rights noted South Africa:

Serious violations were reported during the year, including the death of two workers killed by their employer in a wage dispute, and a striking farm worker killed by security guards. Protest strikes and demonstrations met with violent repression, such as the use of rubber bullets, which in the case of striking truck drivers, led to injuries.

=== Labour and HIV/AIDS ===
South Africa has one of the largest incidence of HIV/AIDS in the world, with a 2005 estimate of 5.5 million people living with HIV, 12.4% of its population. The trade union movement has taken a role in combating that pandemic. COSATU is a key partner in the Treatment Action Campaign (TAC), a registered charity and political force working to educate and promote understanding about HIV/AIDS, and to prevent new infections, as well as push for greater access to antiretrovirals.

COSATU passed a resolution in 1998 to campaign for treatment. "It was clear to the labour movement at that time that its lowest paid members were dying because they couldn’t afford medicines," stated Theodora Steel, Campaigns Coordinator at COSATU. "We saw TAC as a natural ally in a campaign for treatment. We passed a formal resolution at our congress to assist and build TAC."

Notwithstanding the formal alliance of COSATU with the ruling ANC, it has been at odds with the government by calling for the rollout of comprehensive public access to antiretroviral drugs.

=== Labour Relations Act ===
The Labour Relations Act was passed in 1995 and experienced major amendments in 1996 1998 and 2002. Its stated purpose is to "give effect to section 27 of the Constitution" by regulating organisational rights of trade unions, promoting collective bargaining, regulating the right to strike and the recourse to lockouts and providing mechanisms for dispute resolution and the establishment of Labour Court and Labour Appeal Court as superior courts "with exclusive jurisdiction to decide matters arising from the Act". The act also addresses employee participation in decisionmaking and international law obligations in respect to labour relations.

The Labour Relations Act does not apply to the South African National Defence Force, the National Intelligence Agency or the South African Secret Service.

=== Bargaining councils ===
Bargaining councils are formed by registered trade unions and employers' organisations. They deal with collective agreements, attempt to solve labour disputes and make proposals on labour policies and laws. As well, they may administer pension funds, sick pay, unemployment and training schemes and other such benefits for their members. The Amended Labour Relations Act also notes that the councils are to "extend the services and functions of the bargaining council to workers in the informal sector and home workers".

=== Agency Shop Agreements ===
Agency Shop Agreements are struck by a majority trade union (either one union or a coalition of unions representing the majority of workers employed) and an employer or employers' organisation. The agreement requires employers to deduct a fee from the wages of non-union workers to "ensure that non-union workers, who benefit from the union’s bargaining efforts, make a contribution towards those efforts".

Permission from the employee is not required for deductions to be assessed. However, employee who are conscientious objectors and refuse membership in a trade union on the grounds of conscience, they may request for their fees to be paid to a fund administered by the Department of Labour.

=== Closed shop Agreements ===
Closed shop agreements, which require all workers in the covered workplace to join unions, may be struck if two thirds of the workers vote in favour of the agreement. Workers must then join the union or face dismissal. In addition, "if a union expels a member or refuses to allow a new worker to become a union member, and if this expulsion or refusal is in accordance with the union’s constitution or is for a fair reason, then the employer will have to dismiss the worker. This dismissal is not considered unfair". Conscientious objectors may not be dismissed for refusing to join the union.

Restrictions on closed shops include the requirements not to compel workers to be trade union members before obtaining employment and for dues collected from employees to be used only to "advance or protect the socio-economic interests of workers".

== Labour Law Amendment Bill 2026 ==
In 2026, the government implemented a Labour Law Amendment Bill (published in the government gazette on 26 February 2026).

This followed an extended National Economic Development and Labour Council (NEDLAC) negotiation between organised business, organised labour, and the government conducted between 2022 to 2024. The Bill proposed changes to the Labour Relations Act, the Basic Conditions of Employment Act, the Employment Equity Act, and the National Minimum Wage Act, including a R1.8 million annual earnings threshold limiting reinstatement as a remedy in unfair dismissal disputes.

The 2026 amendment also revised minimum weekly allowances for workers under learnership agreements concluded in the terms of the Skills Development Act, 1998, with rates scaled by National Qualifications Framework (NQF) level and credit range, from R455.00 per week for entry-level learnerships up to R2,654.04 per week for the highest NQF band.

The same notice brought minimum wagesin the Contract Cleaning Sector and the Wholesale and Retail Sector into alignment with the National minimum wage, while separately noting that employers unable to afford the new rate may apply to the department of Employment and Labour for an excemption.

=== Update to South African Minimum Wage 2026: ===
Effective 1 March 2026, the national minimum wage increases from R28.79 to R30.23 for each ordinary hour worked.

This hourly rate also applies to farm workers and domestic workers.

EPWP workers

- Effective 1 March 2026, the minimum wage for EPWP workers is R16.62 per hour.

Learnership Rates

- NQF Level 1 to 2 (0–120 credits): R455.00 per week
- NQF Level 1 to 2 (121–240 credits): R909.94 per week
- NQF Level 3 (0–120 credits): R455.00 per week
- NQF Level 3 (121–240 credits): R856.94 per week
- NQF Level 3 (241–360 credits): R1,402.87 per week
- NQF Level 4 (0–120 credits): R455.00 per week
- NQF Level 4 (121–240 credits): R910.04 per week
- NQF Level 4 (241–360 credits): R1,402.87 per week
- NQF Level 4 (361–480 credits): R2,047.41 per week
- NQF Level 5 to 8 (0–120 credits): R455.00 per week
- NQF Level 5 to 8 (121–240 credits): R985.76 per week
- NQF Level 5 to 8 (241–360 credits): R1,474.97 per week
- NQF Level 5 to 8 (361–480 credits): R2,077.79 per week
- NQF Level 5 to 8 (481–600 credits): R2,654.04 per week

Contract Cleaning Sector and Wholesale and Retail Sector

From 1 March 2026, the minimum wages set under Sectoral Determination 1 (Contract Cleaning Sector) and Sectoral Determination 9 (Wholesale and Retail Sector) are brought into line with the national minimum wage rate. Meaning pay must be R30.23 for each ordinary hour worked.
