= Sibeko =

Surname list

Sibeko is a surname. Notable people with the surname include:

- Archibald "Archie" Mncedisi Sibeko (1928–2018), South African political activist and trade unionist
- David Sibeko (1938–1979), South Africa politician and journalist
- Gerald Sibeko (born 1979), South African footballer
- Letitia Sibeko (1930–?), South African political activist, wife of Archie
