= Confederation of South African Workers' Unions =

Trade union in South Africa

CONSAWU
- Confederation of South African Workers' Unions
- Founded: 2003
- Headquarters: 21 Adriana Crescent, Gateway Industrial Park, Rooihuiskraal X25, Centurion, South Africa
- Location: South Africa
- Members: 290 000
- Key people: Mr. Joel Mfingwana, President; Mrs. Thelma Louw, Deputy President; Mr. Monde Mkele, 1st Vice President; Mr. Piet Du Plooy, 2nd Vice President; Mr. Thulani Hlatshwayo, National Treasurer; Mrs. Hilda Marima, Equity Office Bearer; Mr. Rodney Damon, Sector Office Bearer; Mr. Khulile Nkushubana, General Secretary
- Affiliations: ITUC
- Website: http://consawu.co.za/

The Confederation of South African Workers' Unions (CONSAWU) is a national trade union centre in South Africa.

== History ==
The federation was established in 2003 by 21 trade unions which identified themselves as Christian democratic. It applied for membership of the government's National Economic Development and Labour Council, but it was rejected for having a membership below 300,000. In 2006, it engaged in discussions about a merger with rivals the Federation of Unions of South Africa and the National Council of Trade Unions, although they later excluded CONSAWU from the talks, on the grounds that it was too right-wing.

By 2008, the federation claimed a total of 290,000 members, of whom nearly half were members of its largest affiliate, Solidarity. It affiliated with the International Trade Union Confederation. It was largely inactive by 2017, but attempted to revive itself with a promise of lower affiliation fees than rival federations. Solidarity has since withdrawn, along with the National Union of Public Service and Allied Workers, formerly its second-largest affiliate.

== Affiliates ==
=== Current affiliates ===
- Brick and General Workers' Union (BGWU)
- Building, Wood and Allied Workers' Union of South Africa (BWAWUSA)
- Building Workers' Union (BWU)
- Care Centre, Catering, Retail and Allied Workers' Union of South Africa (CCRAWUSA)
- Commercial Workers' Union of South Africa (CUSA)
- Federal Council of Retail and Allied Workers (FEDCRAW)
- Food, Cleaning and Security Workers' Union (FOCSWU)
- Mine, Engineering and Distributor Workers Union of South Africa (MEDWUSA)
- National Certified Fishing and Allied Workers' Union (NACFAWU)
- National Construction Building and Allied Workers' Union (NACBAWU)
- National Union of Education (NUE)
- National Union of Hotel, Restaurant Catering, Commercial Health and Allied Workers (NUHRCCHAW)
- Professional Educators' Union (PEU)
- Progressive General Employees Association of SA (PGEASA)
- South African Building and Allied Workers' Organization (SABAWO)
- South African Food, Retail and Agricultural Workers' Union (SAFRAWU)
- Trawler and Line Fishermen's Union (TALFU)
- Transport Action, Retail and General Workers' Union (THOR)
- Westcoast Workers' Union (WWU)

=== Former affiliates ===
- National Union of Public Service and Allied Workers (NUPSAW)
- Solidarity

== See also ==
- Trade unions in South Africa
