= South African Transport and Allied Workers Union =

Trade union in South Africa

SATAWU
- South African Transport and Allied Workers Union
- Founded: May 2000
- Headquarters: Johannesburg, South Africa
- Location: South Africa
- Members: 90 000
- Key people: Ntuthuzelo Mhlubulwana, President; Jack Mazibuko, General Secretary, Anele Kiet; 1st Deputy General Secretary, Paul Nephawe; 2nd Deputy General Secretary
- Affiliations: COSATU, ITF

The South African Transport and Allied Workers Union (SATAWU) is a trade union in South Africa.

== History ==
In the late 1990s, the South African Railways and Harbours Union (SARHWU) and Transport and General Workers' Union (TGWU) were both affiliates of the Congress of South African Trade Unions and undertook lengthy negotiations on a potential merger. In December 1998, the Black Trade Union of Transnet Workers and the Transnet Allied Trade Union merged into SARWHU, which renamed itself as the "South African Transport and Allied Workers' Union". On 18 May 2000, the TGWU finally merged with this union, forming a new entity, which was also named SATAWU.

The union suffered a split in 2012, when former president Ephraim Mphahlela led around half the membership into the new National Transport Movement. A further split in 2015 led to the founding of the Democratised Transport Logistics and Allied Workers Union. SATAWU is an affiliate of the COSATU and the International Transport Workers' Federation.

=== Chinese arms ship refusal ===
In May 2008, the An Yue Jiang, a ship from the People's Republic of China bearing a large amount of Chinese-manufactured weapons that were bound for Zimbabwe, had docked in Durban harbor; but the dock employees, who were all members of SATAWU, refused to unload the ship of its inventory. SATAWU and COSATU supported the refusal of the cargo, and trade union federations in other southern African countries also refused to unload the ship when it subsequently redocked in other harbors, such as Walvis Bay and Luanda.

== General Secretaries ==
2000: Randall Howard
2009: Zenzo Mahlangu
2018: Jack Mazibuko
2024: Jack Mazabuko
