= 2021 South African metalworkers strike =

Workers and Metalworkers strike in South Africa

- Date: October 5, 2021 – October 21, 2021
- Location: South Africa
- Goals: Higher pay
- Result: 5% to 6% annual pay increases for NUMSA workers

Parties
National Union of Metalworkers of South Africa (NUMSA)	Steel and Engineering Industries Federation of Southern Africa (SEIFSA)

The 2021 South African metalworkers strike was a workers strike among metalworkers in South Africa represented by the National Union of Metalworkers of South Africa (NUMSA) and the Metal and Electrical Workers' Union of South Africa (MEWUSA). Beginning October 5, 2021, workers represented by NUMSA have been on strike demanding higher pay, specifically requesting an 8% across-the-board wage rise in the first year, and inflation plus 2% for the second and third years. The Steel and Engineering Industries Federation of Southern Africa (SEIFSA), an industry association, had offered 4.4% for 2021, inflation plus 0.5% in 2022 and inflation plus 1% in the third year, which was rejected by NUMSA. On October 21, 2021, NUMSA and SEIFSA agreed to a 6% annual increase for lower-paid employees, and a 5-5.5% increase for higher paid employees. The strike impacted mining, construction, engineering and metallurgical businesses throughout the country, with BMW's production in the country particularly impacted. A representative from SEIFSA suggested that the strike cost businesses a total of 600 million South African rand, and resulted in 300 million rand of lost pay for workers.

== Background ==
South Africa has a sizable automotive industry, which is largely export-oriented. The sector employs approximately 110,000 South Africans. Due to the COVID-19 pandemic, exports and production for the county's automotive industry fell by about one-third, and the industry's proportion of South Africa's total gross domestic product (GDP) fell from 6.4% to 4.9%. Major international car brands, such as BMW, Ford, Nissan, and Volkswagen all have production facilities in the country. The Congress of South African Trade Unions (COSATU) had complained that as part of the government's response to the COVID-19 pandemic, they gave many large companies in the country large financial incentives, which companies had hoarded or store in offshore accounts.

Additionally, the country's steel industry is the largest in Africa, and, together with metalworking, accounts for nearly 15% of the country's GDP.

The 2021 metalworkers strike is the first since the 2014 South African platinum strike, which had a significant impact on the South African economy. Labor leaders have stated that they do not want a repeat of the 2014 strike.

Just months before the strike, South Africa suffered a severe episode of unrest triggered by the imprisonment of former President Jacob Zuma. Socialist website World Socialist Web Site also cited the legacy of apartheid and high levels of economic inequality in South Africa as catalysts for increased worker anger.

== Course of the strike ==
The strike began when members of the National Union of Metalworkers of South Africa (NUMSA), a union representing about 155,000 workers, went on strike on October 5, 2021. That day, NUMSA held a large rally in the city of Johannesburg, attracting thousands of demonstrators, many clad in the union's signature red. That day, a poll surveying South African firms showed a worker absenteeism rate of around 26%, a number the executive of the group which conducted the poll said could very possibly rise later that week. Upon the announcement of the strike, South African general union UASA said it would poll its members as to whether to join the strike, and the country's largest trade union federation, the Congress of South African Trade Unions (COSATU), told its workers to stay at home on October 7.

On the following day, October 6, socialist website World Socialist Web Site reported that in the neighborhood of Boksburg North, in the city of Boksburg, private security guards opened fire and shot a striking worker. The guards said they were investigating an attempted murder, but confirmed that the person who was shot "was among the people wearing Numsa T-shirts". The site also reported that police shot striking workers in the Johannesburg suburb of Booysens with rubber bullets, and that another confrontation took place in Krugersdorp, although no shots were fired there.

By October 11, carmaker BMW said that production at its main plant in South Africa was disrupted by the strike, and said that they produced 700 vehicles less than they planned to, due to the strike. The executive director of the National Association of Automotive Component and Allied Manufacturers (NAACAM), an industry association representing the county's automotive industry, expected production to continue to be disrupted by the strike. Neither Ford nor Volkswagen reported disruptions in their production, as of October 14.

Following failed talks on October 13, a representative of NUMSA stated at a press conference the following day that the main roadblock in their negotiations with the Steel and Engineering Industries Federation of Southern Africa (SEIFSA) was pay increases, while other aspects of a potential contract were not an issue in the negotiation. That day, Reuters reported that the Metal and Electrical Workers Union of South Africa (MEWUSA), a smaller union representing 16,000 workers, had joined the strike. Reuters also reported that UASA was also involved in the dispute, but had not joined the strike.

On October 21, NUMSA and SEIFSA agreed to a new contract; workers on the lowest pay grades would get a 6% annual pay increase for all years, and higher-paid employees would get annual increases of between 5% and 5.5%. NUMSA General Secretary Irvin Jim told Bloomberg News that the union settled for this amount in part because companies afflicted by the strike began docking workers' pay, and reached out to workers directly to try to end the strike. Furthermore, momentum was lost when two smaller unions accepted SEIFSA's offer before NUMSA, and SEIFSA told NUMSA workers that they would begin earning equal pay increases if they returned to work immediately.

Despite the agreement between the unions and SEIFSA, three smaller industry associations, SAIFA, NEASA, and CEO, refused to agree to the pay raises laid out by NUMSA and SEIFSA. When announcing the end of the strike, Irvin Jim said that he was reaching out to the Minister of Labor to see if the deal could be enforced across the industry.

Jim defended reaching a deal, saying that "each and every day on a strike is a sacrifice". Conversely, Patrick Martin, a writer for the World Socialist Web Site, harshly criticized the deal, calling it a "rotten betrayal of the courageous struggle waged by the workers", and noting that real wages would actually decrease if inflation in South Africa, which was 5% at the time of the deal, increased.
