= Emma Mashinini =

South African trade unionist (1929–2017)

- Born: 21 August 1929; Rosettenville, Johannesburg, South Africa
- Died: 10 July 2017 (aged 87)
- Other names: "Tiny Giant"
- Education: Bantu Secondary School
- Alma mater: Honorary doctorate in literature and philosophy, Unisa
- Occupations: Trade unionist; Land commissioner; Textile worker
- Employer: Henochsberg's Clothing Factory
- Organizations: Secretary of the South African Commercial, Catering and Allied Workers Union (1975–1986); Member of the Truth and Reconciliation Commission (TRC); Director, Department of Justice and Reconciliation, Anglican Church of Southern Africa (1986); Commissioner, Restitution of Land Rights (1995–2002)
- Notable work: Strikes Have Followed Me All My Life, autobiography
- Awards: The National Women's Assembly for Labour award (1986); The Gauteng Premier's Award for Women Achievers (2001); The Lifetime Social Leader Award (2007); The Trevor Huddleston "Not for Your Comfort" Award (2008); The Elijah Bahayi Award (2008); Order of the Baobab (2007); National Order of Luthuli in Bronze (2007)

Emma Mashinini (21 August 1929 – 10 July 2017) was a South African trade unionist and political leader. Living in Johannesburg, her family was forcibly displaced several times during her childhood. She started working at age 14 and soon became a union organiser at her garment factory. She became active with the African National Congress (ANC) in 1956. Mashinini served for 12 years on the executive board of the National Union of Clothing Workers (NUCW) and founded the South African Commercial, Catering and Allied Workers Union (SACCAWU) in 1975. She was arrested and detained without charges for six months in 1981–82.

Mashinini played several important roles in the transition to ANC rule in the 1980s and 1990s. She served on the South African Truth and Reconciliation Commission and went on to become a Commissioner for Restitution of Land Rights. Her autobiography, titled Strikes Have Followed Me All My Life, was published in 1989 and republished in 2012. She received numerous awards and decorations, including the Order of the Baobab and the Order of Luthuli.

== Early life ==
Mashinini was born in Rosettenville, a white suburb of Johannesburg. Her family lived in the backyard of a house where her mother, Joana, did housework. When Mashinini was six years old, her family moved to Prospect Township, a neighbourhood near City Deep. Prospect Township was a common destination for Black families who had been evicted from their residence in White areas. In 1936, this neighbourhood too was aggressively gentrified, razed under the Johannesburg Slums Act of 1934. Most of the people in Prospect Township were relocated to Orlando, Soweto, but Mashinini's family was able to resettle in Sophiatown. Sophiatown was forcibly evicted in turn, several years later, and Mashinini's family moved to Soweto.

Mashinini left school at age 14 to work a job after the separation of her parents left her mother without enough money. She got married at age 17 and gave birth to six children. Three died in their early days of life, due to the inadequate medical care available for Black babies. (Her daughter Penny died at the age of 17 in 1971.)

Mashinini attended the 1955 Congress of the People in Kliptown, a major event for the African National Congress (ANC). She later wrote:

I was not a card-carrying member, but at that meeting I was a member in body, spirit and soul... So I think that Congress was really an eye-opener for me. That, maybe, is when I started to be politicized. Although there is another thing, which I have always felt, which is that I have always resented being dominated.

== Union organiser ==
In 1956, Mashinini began working in the Henochsberg clothing factory, which was segregated by race as well as gender. In addition to the difficult conditions and bad pay offered to factory workers, Black women faced a unique and many-layered set of challenges. Treated as inferior to other workers, Black women faced police brutality and the violence of poverty under Apartheid when they returned home each day. Black workers also faced difficulties in getting to work on time—from the segregated neighbourhoods to which they had been confined.

Mashinini joined the Garment Workers Union and organised in her factory. She became both a shop steward and a floor supervisor appointed by management. She later described the difficult situation resulting from these two positions:

They could have sacked me if they had wanted. I was a shop steward, but if they wanted to sack you they could still sack you. Instead, they would try and use me to stop the trouble. They would use me like a fire extinguisher, always there to stop trouble.

Ultimately, she wrote, "I had a dual role in the factory, but I was very clear where my first loyalty lay. I was appointed a supervisor but I was elected to be a shop steward by my fellow workers."

Through different labour actions, the factory workers gained a 40-hour workweek and unemployment insurance. She was elected to the executive committee of the National Union of Clothing Workers (NUCW), on which she served for twelve years.

A turning point for Mashinini came when she thought about how clothing produced in her factory was being used. "When I realized that I had personally helped to make these uniforms used for the slaughter of my people ... I felt horrified", she wrote in her autobiography. She resolved that union organising would always touch on larger political issues.

In 1975, Mashinini founded the South African Commercial, Catering and Allied Workers Union (SACCAWU), becoming a powerful figure in the South African labour movement at large. Her activism led to constant police harassment.

== Arrest and imprisonment ==
On 27 November 1981, police arrived at dawn to Mashinini's home, searching the building and arresting Mashinini. She was detained under section 6 of the 1967 Terrorism Act, a law which allowed indefinite detention of anyone deemed by police to "endanger the maintenance of law and order."

Mashinini was brought to Pretoria Central Prison. She spent much time in solitary confinement and was denied access to basic necessities. She was eventually transferred to a prison in Johannesburg and released after a total of six months—never charged with a crime. Upon release, she was ordered never to talk about her time in prison. While she was in prison, her comrade Neil Aggett died hanging in his cell.

Her husband, Tom Mashinini, raised awareness about her imprisonment and organised demonstration at the Supreme Court.

After her period of detention, Mashinini was treated in Denmark for post-traumatic stress disorder. She rejected her therapist's advice that she should withdraw from politics and focus on herself. She described this treatment as "yet another detention." She returned to a leadership position in the SACCAWU, which expanded to 60,000 members and won increased rights for female workers.

== Transition to ANC rule ==
When the Congress of South African Trade Unions (Cosatu) was being formed in 1985, Mashinini was an outspoken advocate for the inclusion of female unionists. After considering a series of images which did not include women, Cosatu eventually adopted a logo prominently including a woman with a baby.

In 1995, Mashinini was appointed as a Commissioner for Restitution of Land Rights, returning to Pretoria as a part of the government. In 1998, she helped to secure land rights for a community of 600 families that had been evicted in 1969. During her tenure, she said that her agency suffered from a lack of personnel and funding. In 2002, she commented that she was "greatly distressed" by a court ruling limiting compensation for the many South Africans claiming land rights. "I saw the task for myself and for ourselves as getting the land back to the people," she said.

== Death ==
Mashinini died in Johannesburg on 10 July 2017 at the age of 87.

== Works ==
- Strikes Have Followed Me All My Life, autobiography
