= South African Railways and Harbours =

South African Railways and Harbours could refer to:

- South African Railways & Harbours Administration
- South African Railways and Harbours Union
