= Strikes Have Followed Me All My Life =

1989 book by Emma Mashinini

- Author: Emma Mashinini
- Publisher: The Women's Press
- Publication date: 1989
- ISBN: 9780704341777

Strikes Have Followed Me All My Life is an autobiographical book by Emma Mashinini. It was first published in 1989 by The Women's Press, Ltd., in London, England, and republished in 2012 by Pan Macmillan in Johannesburg with a new foreword by Jay Naidoo.

The book is about Emma Mashinini, Secretary of the South African Commercial, Catering and Allied Workers Union. Emma was born to a slightly better circumstance than most, living in the backyard of a white suburb, instead of the homelands, or townships where black South Africans were usually forced to live under apartheid. She started working in a textile factory and rose to become the founder of a new union. Shortly after this, she was arrested without charge under the South African Terrorism Act. She was mentally tortured and given subpar conditions in which to live during her stay at multiple prisons. At one hearttouching moment in the book, she nearly panics because she cannot remember the name of one of her children. The book served as the first time that her children will ever know this. Upon leaving prison, she resumes union work, and must deal with a variety of psychological problems. This book was written against threats of death from the South African government, and chronicles the life of a woman who endured psychological and physical torture for the cause of a free democratic government in South Africa.

Desiree Lewis describes the book as "a vivid account of life for a woman who balances trade unionism and political activism with domestic work and conventional "womanly" roles." The work received positive reviews from Publishers Weekly and from Thomas Thale of the Vista University Soweto Campus.
