= Council of Trade Unions =

Council of Trade Unions may refer to:

- Australian Council of Trade Unions
- National Council of Trade Unions
- New Zealand Council of Trade Unions
