= South African Policing Union =

Trade union in South Africa

SAPU
- South African Policing Union
- Location: South Africa
- Affiliations: SAFTU
- Website: www.sapu.org.za

The South African Policing Union (SAPU) was established in November 1993 and has an extensive membership within the policing cluster which includes the South African Police Service (SAPS), Department of Correctional Services (DCS), Metro Police Departments and Traffic Departments.

SAPU is a participating union in the Public Service Co-ordinating Bargaining Council (PSCBC) and the Safety and Security Sectoral Bargaining Council (SSSBC) where transverse and sector employee issues are negotiated. On December 23, 2020, Peter Ntsime, the Acting Deputy General Secretary of SAPU, declared that SAPS' image was tainted the previous when Colonel Kamelash Dalip Singh, a senior SAPU policeman from the KwaZulu-Natal Provincial Anti-Corruption Unit, was arrested, and then released on bail, on a bribe charge. Ntsime claimed Singh was at the forefront of arresting crooked police officers and was onto a big syndicate. Despite a statement from Directorate for Priority Crime Investigation (Hawks) spokesperson Captain Simphiwe Mhlongo that undercover Hawks cops caught Singh red-handed accepting a R5,000 bribe, people took to social media to join Ntsime in criticizing his arrest as well.
