= National Union of Public Service and Allied Workers =

Trade union in South Africa

The National Union of Public Service and Allied Workers (NUPSAW) is a trade union representing public sector workers in South Africa.

The union was founded on 13 August 1998, with the merger of several smaller unions. It affiliated to the Confederation of South African Workers' Unions, but left in 2016 to become a founding affiliate of the more left-wing South African Federation of Trade Unions. By 2023, it had about 60,000 members.
