= Archie Sibeko =

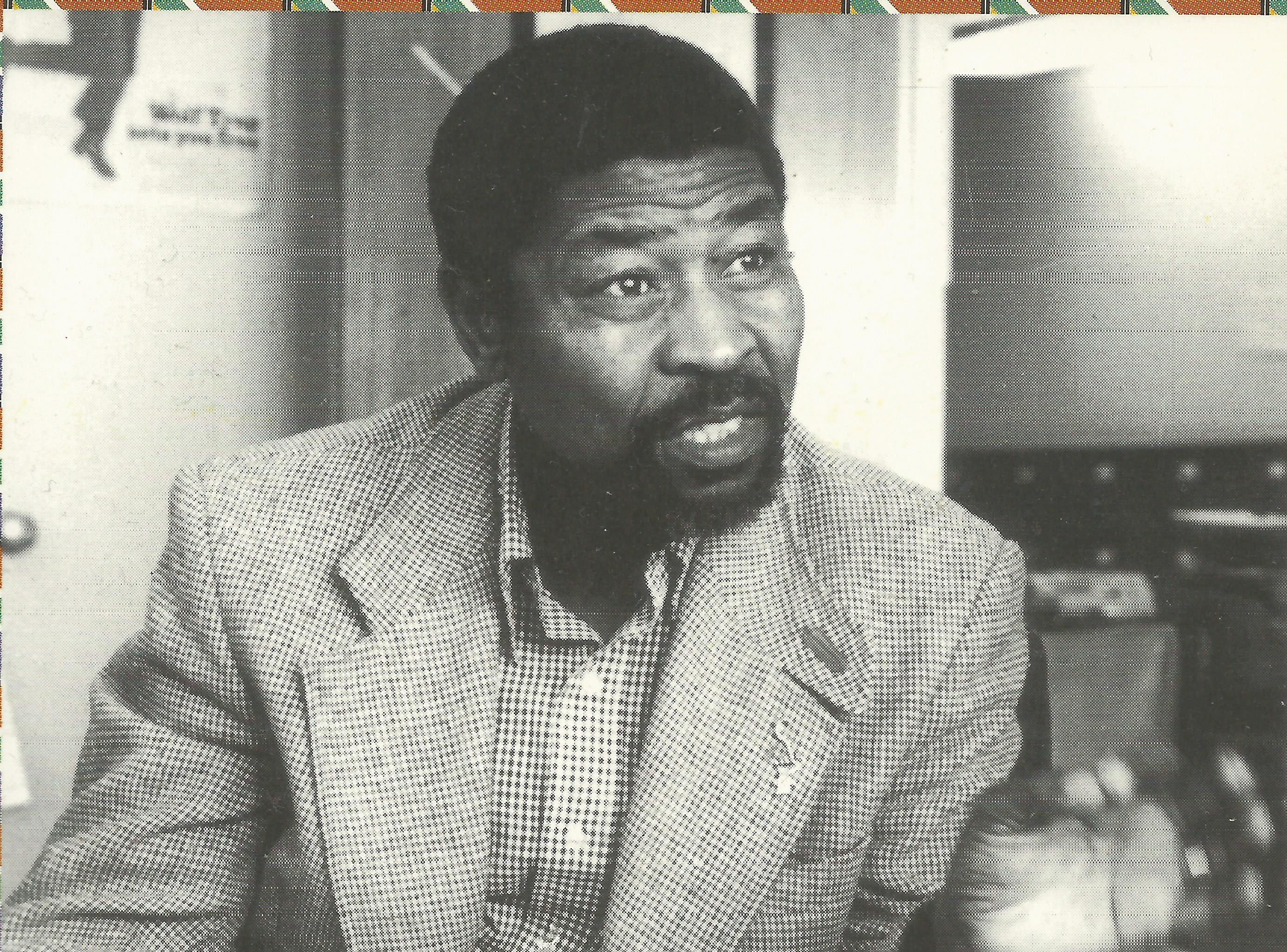
Archie Sibeko

Archibald Mncedisi Sibeko OLS (3 March 1928 – 27 March 2018) was a South African anti-apartheid activist, trade unionist and political leader.

== Early life ==
Born in Kwezana in the Eastern Cape, Archie Sibeko grew up in a traditional Xhosa environment. His father was prosperous but died when Archie was 4 or 5. His mother was his father's second wife and they had 4 children together. He attended the village school. He later attended Lovedale Practising School. Before he went to High School, for which fees had to be paid, he went to work for a year to raise money. He worked for a greengrocer in Maitland, near Kensington, Cape Town. He was paid £2 a week and given food and sleeping accommodation. He insisted on his employer arranging a permit for him to live and work in the city. He was a boarder at Lovedale High School for three years. He then obtained a diploma in Agriculture from Fort Cox College of Agriculture & Forestry and soon after graduation he went to Cape Town to find employment, so that he could provide an income for his young family. While in Cape Town, he crossed paths with political activist and trade unionist Oscar Mpetha, who mentored and guided him into his first steps as a Trade Union activist. He became an active member of both the African National Congress (ANC) and the South African Communist Party, recruited by Ben Turok, in 1953. He became the Secretary of the South African Railways and Harbours Union after meeting Oscar Mpetha who taught him about trade unionism and politics, and introduced him to Ray Alexander.
He married Letitia Sibeko (née Hina) in 1953.

== Political career ==
Sibeko's political activities started in the 1950s and continued until the end of the apartheid regime. He worked alongside political leaders such as Ray Alexander, Elizabeth 'Nanna' Abrahams, Elizabeth Mafekeng and Chris Hani. In 1961, he was arrested with Hani due to their involvement in Umkontho we Sizwe (MK) which was established as the armed wing of the ANC.

Sibeko was sent out of the country by the ANC to neighbouring Tanzania, leaving his wife and five children. There he became a Commander at MK's first camp. Later, he was deployed to London, where he helped mobilise the international trade union movement in support of the struggle against apartheid. In 1990, after more than two decades in exile, Sibeko was able to return to South Africa where he worked as Deputy Chairman of the ANC in the Western Cape and Honorary President of his union, the South African Railways and Harbours Union. Because of pressure of work, he suffered a stroke in 1992 and was advised to retire from active politics.

== Retirement ==
Reluctantly, Sibeko agreed to retire and relocated to the United Kingdom, where he lived with his second wife, Joyce Leeson. He continued to take a close interest in South Africa. He returned to be a monitor in the 1994 elections and continued involvement in some of the trade unions he worked with in exile. He was Founding President and a committee member of the Tyume Valley Schools organisation, a charity that resources education in his home region. Newcastle City Council donated £1000 to the charity in 2014. He wrote four books documenting his life and aspects of the struggle against apartheid.

Sibeko also used the names Zola Zembe and Zola Ntambo.

He was awarded the Order of Luthuli in Silver.

== See also ==
- Letitia Sibeko
