= Mildred Ramakaba-Lesiea =

South African politician

Mildred Ramakaba-Lesiea OLS

Member of the National Assembly
- In office 1998 – June 2009

Personal details
- Born: Mandongoane Mildred Ramakaba; 28 January 1933 (age 93) Langa, Cape Town; Cape Province, Union of South Africa
- Party: African National Congress
- Other political affiliations: South African Communist Party
- Spouse: James Lesiea (m. 1952; div. 1971)

Mandu Mildred Ramakaba-Lesiea (née Ramakaba; born 28 January 1933) is a South African politician and veteran of the African National Congress (ANC), which she joined in 1954. After the end of apartheid in 1994, she represented the ANC in the National Assembly from 1998 to 2004.

Ramakaba-Lesiea joined the ANC in the early years of the struggle against apartheid in order to participate in the campaign against the Bantu Education Act of 1953. In subsequent decades, she was a prominent figure in women's activism and community organising in Cape Town; she was imprisoned under the Suppression of Communist Act in the 1960s and was detained for her activism on several other occasions. In 2005, the South African government awarded her the Order of Luthuli in Silver in recognition of her contribution to the struggle.

== Early life ==
Ramakaba-Lesiea was born on 28 January 1933 in Langa outside Cape Town in the former Cape Province. Her father, Sello Ramakaba, was originally from Lesotho and grew up in the Orange Free State; her mother, Francina Pretorius, also grew up in the Free State but was racially mixed, with an Afrikaans mother and a Sotho father. During her childhood, the family moved to Kensington, where she attended high school until standard six (grade eight). In 1949, her father died and her mother remarried an ex-soldier who encouraged her to marry due to the family's financial constraints. Instead, Ramakaba-Lesiea left home to work as a live-in domestic worker in Sea Point.

== Anti-apartheid activism ==
In 1952, Ramakaba-Lesiea moved with her newlywed husband to Elsie's River, where they stayed in an informal settlement called Maseru (after Lesotho's capital city, for the large number of Masotho residents). Two years later, the apartheid government began implementing the Bantu Education Act; Ramakaba-Lesiea's opposition to the legislation drew her into anti-apartheid activism, first through the Elsie's River Civic Association and then through the African National Congress (ANC), both of which she joined in 1954. Over the next several years she participated in large-scale civil disobedience campaigns, including protests against pass laws and forced removals. She became a local leader in the ANC Women's League in Cape Town and was active in the Federation of South African Women; by 1958, she had also secretly joined the South African Communist Party, which was already banned by the apartheid government. In 1959 she also began organising for the Brick, Cement and Quarry Workers' Union, an affiliate of the South African Congress of Trade Unions.

Ramakaba-Lesiea was detained for fourteen days in 1959 after a women's anti-dompas protest, and later in 1959 she was forcibly removed from Elsie's River to Nyanga in terms of the Group Areas Act. She was detained for a further five months in 1963, much of the time in solitary confinement, and then, shortly after her release, was rearrested. In 1964, she and 44 others (including Oscar Mpetha) were charged with sabotage under the Suppression of Communism Act; she was convicted and sentenced to six years' imprisonment, and she became the first woman to be held at Pollsmoor Prison before her sentence was overturned in an appeal in 1965. After her release, she was subject to house arrest, and in 1966 she was briefly forced to move to distant Witsieshoek during a dispute with the government about her compliance with pass laws.

She ultimately returned to domestic work and then to factory work. At the same time, she remained active in the women's movement and was increasingly involved in supporting the families of political detainees. She was a founding member and inaugural chairperson of Cape Town's United Women's Organisation in 1981. Throughout the 1980s she was active in the United Democratic Front and did underground work for the ANC. She was detained for another five months during the 1985 state of emergency.

== Post-apartheid political career ==
After South Africa's first post-apartheid elections in 1994, Ramakaba-Lesiea was involved in the national executive of the ANC Women's League and represented the ANC as a local councillor in Gugulethu, Cape Town from 1995 to 1998. She was sent to Parliament to fill an ANC seat in 1998, and she was elected to a full term in the National Assembly in the 1999 general election. She was re-elected in 2004. After her retirement, and as of 2017, she remained a member of her local ANC branch in Gugulethu.

== Honours ==
In 2004, the Western Cape Premier, Ebrahim Rasool, awarded Ramakaba-Lesiea provincial honours, the Office of the Order of the Disa. The following year, President Thabo Mbeki awarded her the Order of Luthuli in Silver for "her excellent contribution to the struggle for gender equality and a non-racial, just and democratic South Africa". In 2017, Thandi Modise, in her capacity as Chancellor of the Cape Peninsula University of Technology, awarded Ramakaba-Lesiea with an honorary doctorate in public management.

== Personal life ==
Ramakaba-Lesiea married James Lesiea in 1952; he was from Aliwal North but worked in a hotel in Sea Point. They had three daughters together and divorced in 1971.
