= Maxwell Moss =

South African politician (born 1960)

Member of the National Assembly
- In office June 1999 – May 2009
- Constituency: Western Cape

Personal details
- Born: Maxwell Izekiel Moss; 15 May 1960 (age 65)
- Citizenship: South Africa
- Party: African National Congress
- Awards: Order of the Disa

Maxwell Izekiel Moss (born 15 May 1960) is a South African politician who represented the African National Congress (ANC) in the National Assembly from 1999 to 2009. He served the Western Cape constituency.

== Early life and activism ==
Moss was born on 15 May 1960. He was involved in the anti-apartheid movement, including through the West Coast Council of Churches and the National Union of Metalworkers; he was imprisoned at Pollsmoor for his activism. In 1993, while Moss was working as campaign organiser for the ANC ahead of the 1994 general election, he was left unable to walk after a car accident.

== Legislative career ==
Moss served two consecutive terms in the National Assembly, gaining election in 1999 and 2004. He represented the Western Cape constituency. During his second term, he faced criminal charges in connection with his alleged involvement in the Travelgate scandal, but the charges were withdrawn in February 2007 for what the National Prosecuting Authority said were humanitarian reasons.

Moss left Parliament after the 2009 general election. As of 2010, he headed the economic transformation desk of the ANC's Western Cape branch.

== Honours ==
In 2004, the Western Cape Provincial Government awarded Moss its highest public service award, the Order of the Disa, "for his perseverance and personal dedication to improving the lives of the people of our province".
