= South African Chemical Workers' Union =

Trade union in South Africa

The South African Chemical Workers' Union (SACWU) is a trade union representing workers in the chemical industry in South Africa.

The union was founded in 1973 and affiliated to the Consultative Committee, a loose grouping of trade unions. It was initially very small, and had grown to only 960 members by 1979. In 1980, it affiliated to the new Council of Unions of South Africa, and grew rapidly, with 9,479 members by the end of the year. In 1986, it transferred to the new National Council of Trade Unions (NACTU), at which point it had 30,000 members.

By 1994, SACWU was NACTU's largest affiliate, its membership being similar to that of the rival Chemical Workers' Industrial Union. In 2011, its membership was about 30,000.
