= Liz Abrahams =

South African Communist Party politician

Elizabeth Adriana Abrahams
- Born: Elizabeth Adriana Josephs; 19 September 1925; Paarl, Union of South Africa
- Died: 17 December 2008 (aged 83); Paarl, Western Cape, South Africa
- Other name: Liz Abrahams
- Education: Bethanie School
- Organization(s): Food and Canning Workers Union (FCWU), Coloured People’s Congress (CPC), Federation of South African Women (FEDSAW), Food and Allied Workers Union (FAWU)
- Title: Member of Parliament
- Term: 1995-2000
- Political party: South African Communist Party
- Awards: Order of the Counsellor of the Baobab in bronze, Elijah Barayi Award
- Honours: Honorary Doctorate in Commerce from the University of Western Cape

Elizabeth Adriana Abrahams (née Josephs, 19 September 1925 – 17 December 2008) was a South African political activist and trade unionist who participated actively in the movement against apartheid. She became General Secretary of the Food and Canning Workers Union (FCWU) in 1955, a duty she performed until 1964. Her activism brought her close to activists including Elizabeth Mafikeng, Archie Sibeko, Oscar Mpetha and Ray Alexander. She was in 1986 detained for police questioning and subsequently detained for almost three months without trial. After her retirement, Abrahams remained actively involved in the Food and Allied Workers Union (FAWU), and was in 1995, a year after South Africa's first democratic elections, elected to serve as a Member of Parliament. During the last years of her life, Abrahams received several awards for her contributions to the liberation movement and for her activities on behalf of the rights of the working class.

== Early life ==
Elizabeth "Nanna" Abrahams was born in 1925 into a working-class coloured family in the Paarl Valley in the Western Cape, Union of South Africa. She had four brothers and four sisters. She attended Bethanie School in Paarl, which was a multi-racial education institution, until sixth year. Her father was employed in the wood industry and made bricks, and her mother worked in a fruit canning factory.

Abrahams showed enthusiasm for politics from an early age, an interest she later attributed to her father's own interest in reading and discussing political issues. The economic climate in Paarl during Abrahams's childhood severely limited job opportunities. After the death of her father, when she was 14, she dropped out of school to work as a seasonal labourer in a local fruit canning factory. There she experienced first hand the harsh conditions workers faced, including long working hours, low wages and a lack of restrooms.

== Political activity ==
The frequent periods of unemployment associated with life as a seasonal labourer contributed to Abrahams's increasing awareness of the poor conditions endured by the workers, and especially by women. The Food and Canning Workers Union (FCWU) was established in 1941. Abrahams was recruited to join by Ray Alexander Simons, who was then an active communist and trade unionist. Though women members were granted only a limited role in the union's early days, Abrahams, among other female members, began to take on an important organizational and uniting role. She was quickly promoted from the subs steward on the factory floor to branch secretary.

Abrahams promoted the cause of non-racialism among union members, an issue of increasing controversy after a 1947 apartheid law banned racially mixed unions, threatening the FCWU's stability and unity. In 1955 Abrahams was elected chief negotiator and General Secretary of FCWU, a position she held until 1964. In 1959, she assisted workers in organising the campaign against proposed wage cuts by the Langeberg Ko-operasie management in Port Elizabeth. She also campaigned against the implementation of the Group Areas Act.

Abrahams FCWU leadership was characterised by a strong commitment to the union and an unwavering support for the anti-apartheid movement, which eventually led her to join the Coloured People’s Congress (CPC). She also joined the Federation of South African Women (FEDSAW), becoming an executive member.

== Banning ==
Her political activities earned Abrahams a five-year ban from the union under the Suppression of Communism Act in August 1964, and she spent the ban period under house arrest and unable to enter the factory. Despite her banishment, Abrahams continued working for the union and assisting comrades such as Elizabeth Mafekeng and Archie Sibeko, both of whom faced exile. In 1979, Abrahams organised the Fattis and Monis strike in Bellville, which lasted for several months.

In 1983, Abrahams was involved in a serious car accident and spent 14 days in Malmesbury Hospital. She retired from the fruit factory and the Union in 1985, after her injuries became too much for her to continue.

On 13 June 1986, Abrahams was again detained and kept under custody without trial, for a period of three months. She was held in Paarl then in Pollsmoor Prison, Cape Town.

== Later life ==
After her injuries and retirement, Abrahams continued helping the Food and Allied Workers Union (FAWU) with the organisation of farm workers in the Nooder Paarl and Pniel branches. She also supported and advised young organisers and consulted with other organisations like the Congress of South African Students on issues such as gender discrimination, racism and union organising strategies.

In 1990, she was elected the interim chair of the Paarl African National Congress (ANC) branch. Other leadership positions followed as she was vice-chair of the ANC's Women's League and a member of the South African Communist Party. In 1995, she became a member of the first democratically elected South African Parliament, serving until 2000.

In 2005, Abrahams biography Married to the Struggle was published by the University of the Western Cape in celebration of her 80th birthday.

== Awards ==
Abrahams was awarded the Order of the Counsellor of the Baobab in bronze from South African President Thabo Mbeki in 2002.

Honorary Freedom of the Drakenstein Local Municipality was awarded to Abrahams in 2005.

FAWU awarded her the Elijah Barayi Award at the Congress of South African Trade Unions (COSATU) national congress in 2007.

Abrahams was also awarded an Honorary Doctorate in Commerce by the University of Western Cape in 2007.

== Death ==
Abrahams died at her home in Paarl on 17 December 2008 aged 83, surrounded by family and friends.
