= National Professional Teachers' Organisation of South Africa =

Trade union in South Africa

NAPTOSA
- National Professional Teachers' Organisation of South Africa
- Founded: 1 November 1991
- Headquarters: Pretoria, South Africa
- Location: South Africa
- Members: 55,000
- Key people: Basil Manuel, General Secretary; Thabo Manne, President
- Website: www.naptosa.org.za

The National Professional Teachers' Organisation of South Africa (NAPTOSA) is a professional organisation of teachers in South Africa. It is headquartered in Pretoria, South Africa.

== History ==
The union was founded in 1991 as a federation. By 1997, it included the following unions:

- African Teachers' Association of South Africa
- National Union of Educators
- Professional Educators' Union
- Transvaal Association of Teachers
- Transvaal Teachers' Association

On 1 November 2006, NAPTOSA was reconstituted as a single, unitary, trade union. The Professional Educators' Union opted to remain independent, but NAPTOSA works with it, the Natal Association of Teachers' Unions and the Suid-Afrikaanse Onderwysers Unie in the Combined Trade Unions, for the purpose of recognition by the Education Labour Relations Chamber.
