= Michael Lapsley =

South African Anglican priest (born 1949)

The Reverend Michael Lapsley SSM
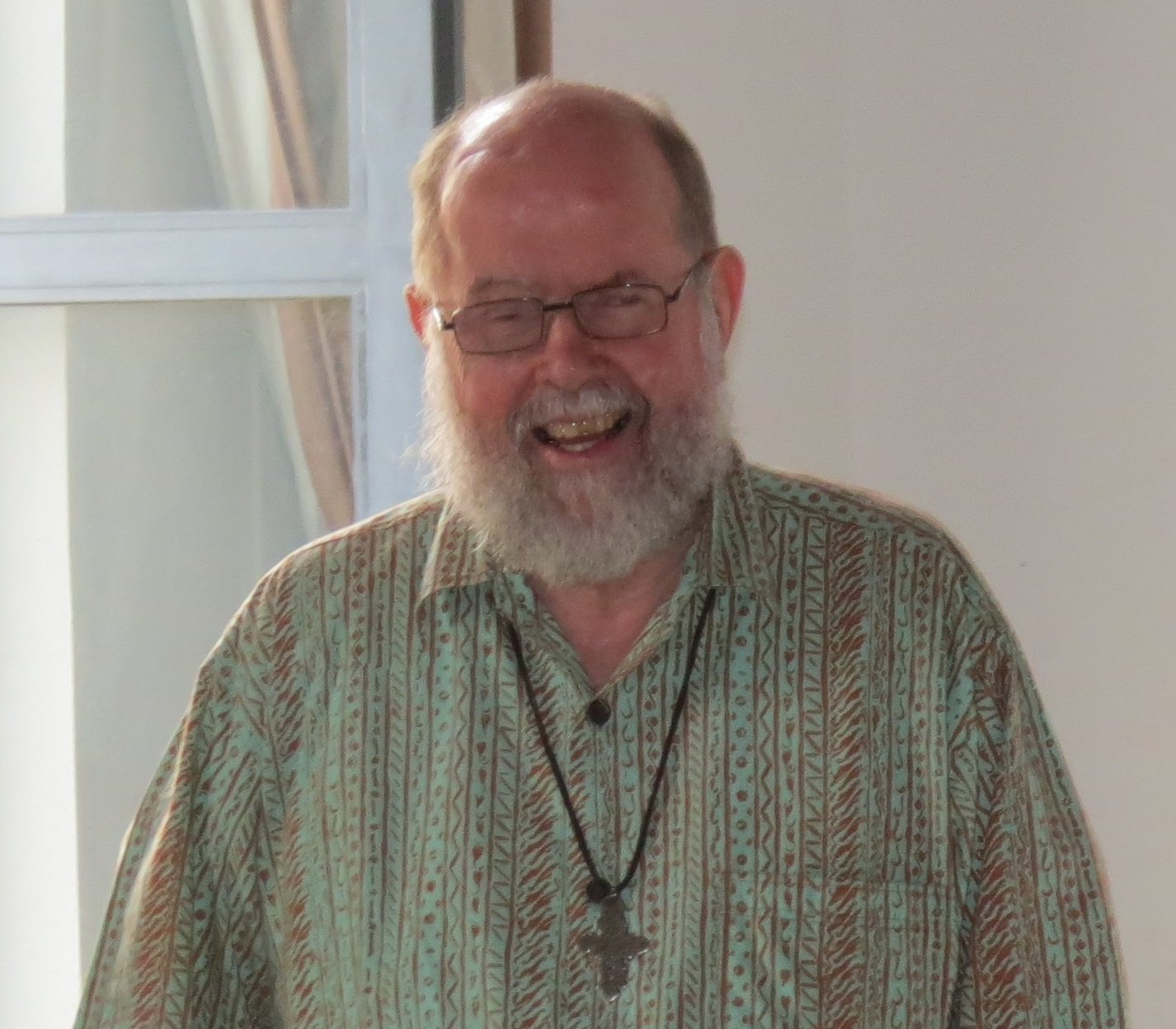
- Lapsley in 2017
- Born: Alan Michael Lapsley; New Zealand
- Occupation: Priest
- Known for: Social justice activism

Alan Michael Lapsley, SSM is a New Zealand-born Anglican priest and social justice activist in South Africa. After being ordained in Australia and moving to South Africa during the apartheid years in 1973, Lapsley has been a voice for social justice and peace.

In 1990 he was badly injured by a letter bomb sent to him by the apartheid regime, losing both hands and the sight in one eye. In 1998 he founded the Institute for Healing of Memories (IHOM) in Cape Town, which now works across the world.

== Early life and education ==
Alan Michael Lapsley was born in New Zealand. He was ordained to the priesthood in Australia, where he joined the Anglican religious order the Society of the Sacred Mission (SSM).

In 1973 he arrived in Durban, South Africa, as an undergraduate student.

Lapsley is a graduate of the Australian College of Theology, the National University of Lesotho, and the University of Zimbabwe.

== Career and activism ==
Soon after arriving in South Africa, during the height of apartheid repression, he became a chaplain to students at both black and white universities in Durban. In 1976, he began to speak out on behalf of schoolchildren who were being shot, detained and tortured.

=== Social justice and anti-apartheid activism ===
1976 was the year of the Soweto Uprising, which sparked protests across the country. Fr Michael, as he was known, took a stand as national chaplain to Anglican students, a position he held at the time.

In September 1976, he was expelled from the country. He went to live in Lesotho, where he continued his studies and became a member of the African National Congress and a chaplain to the organization in exile. During this period he traveled the world, mobilizing faith communities, in particular, to oppose apartheid and support the liberation struggle.

=== Letter bomb ===
After a police raid in Maseru in 1982 in which 42 people were killed, he moved to Zimbabwe. It was here that in 1990, three months after ANC leader Nelson Mandela's release from prison, he was sent a letter bomb by the apartheid regime, most likely the Civil Cooperation Bureau. It was hidden inside two religious magazines. He lost both hands and the sight in one eye in the blast, and was seriously burnt.

On his return to South Africa in 1992 he helped to start the association Friends of Cuba and later became its first national president. He was awarded the Cuban Friendship Medal by the Cuban Council of State. As of 2026 he is honorary life president of the Friends of Cuba Society.

=== Post-apartheid work ===
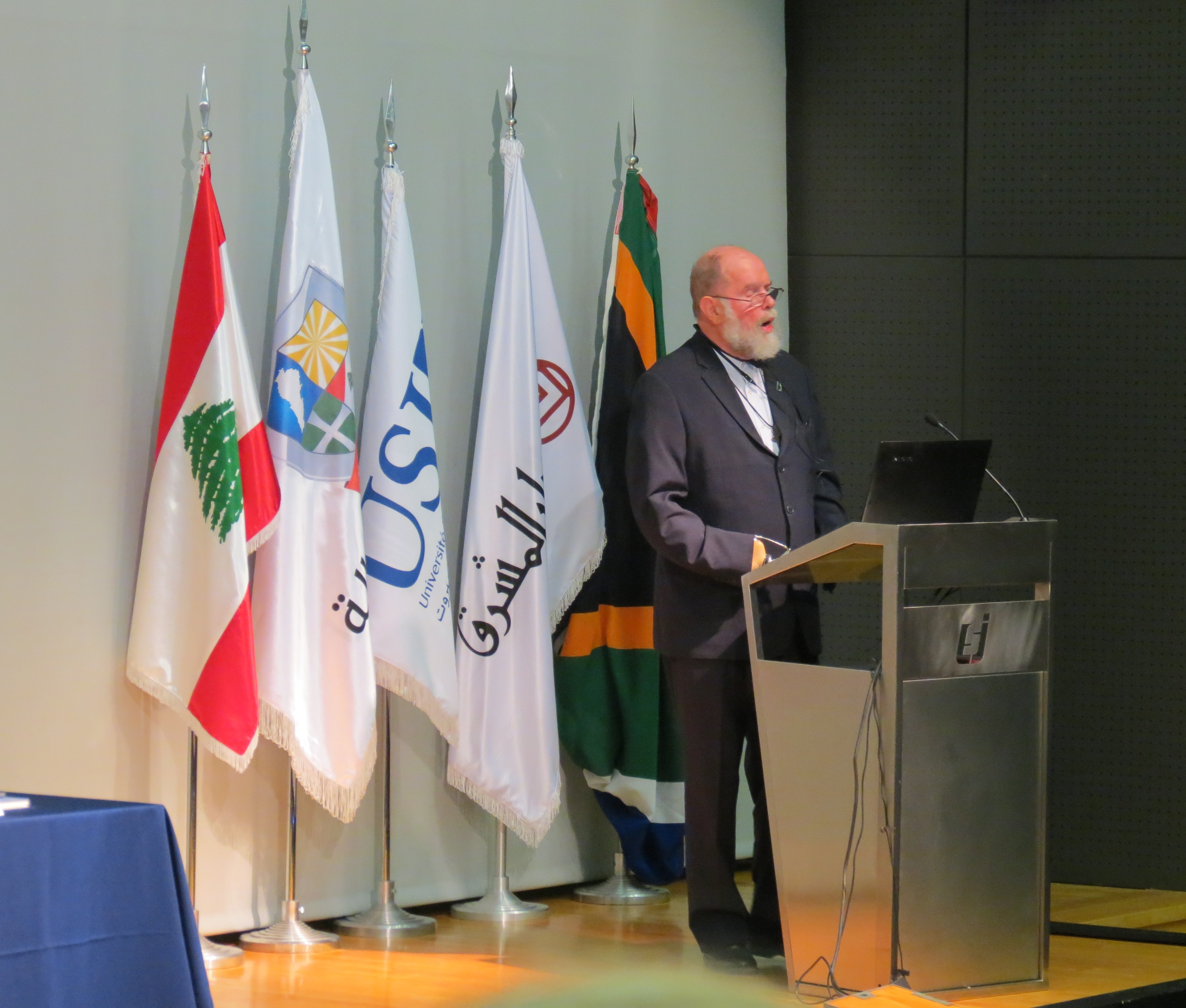
Lapsley speaking at the Saint Joseph University in Beirut in 2017

In 1993, he became chaplain of the Trauma Centre for Victims of Violence and Torture in Cape Town, which assisted the country's Truth and Reconciliation Commission (TRC). This work led to the establishment, in 1998, of the Institute for Healing of Memories (IHOM) in Cape Town. The IHOM aims to allow many more South Africans to tell their stories in workshops where they work through their trauma. The IHOM is based in Cape Town, but Lapsley has worked in many other countries, in Africa and across the world. The organisation now works with groups including those affected by political violence; those affected and infected by HIV and AIDS; refugees and asylum seekers; prisoners and war veterans. The IHOM is also a not for profit organisation in the United States.

In August 2026, Lapsley called for global support for Cuba, after the US applied an economic sanctions on the country.

== Other activities ==
Lapsley was vice president of the South African Council of Churches from 2014 to 2017.

For the fifth anniversary of September 11 attacks on the United States (held on 8 September 2006), Lapsley joined more than 30 terror victims from all around the world and families of those killed then to create the International Network for Peace to promote effective and nonviolent solutions to terrorism.

== Recognition and honours ==
In 2008, Lapsley was awarded the Diakonia Award.

He has honorary doctorates from the Macquarie University in Sydney, Australia; the University of KwaZulu-Natal; University of the Western Cape; Liverpool Hope University (UK); Virginia Theological Seminary (US); and Rhodes University (South Africa).

He has been awarded the Queen's Service Medal by the Government of New Zealand for service to Southern African communities. As of 2020 he was Honorary Consul for New Zealand in Cape Town.

Lapsley was the subject of the biographical work Priest and Partisan: A South African Journey (1996) by fellow South African priest and theologian Michael Worsnip, with a foreword by Nelson Mandela.

Mandela said of him, "Michael’s life represents a compelling metaphor: We read about a foreigner who came to our country and was transformed by what he saw of the injustices of apartheid. His life is part of the tapestry of many long journeys and struggles of our people and "Michael Lapsley's life is part of the tapestry of the many long journeys and struggles of our people."

The Government of the Western Cape awarded him the Order of the Disa.

== Publications ==
=== Books ===
- Lapsley, M. (1986). Neutrality Or Co-option?: Anglican Church and State from 1964 Until the Independence of Zimbabwe. Mambo Press. 1986. ISBN 978-0-86922-407-6.
- Lapsley, M., & Karakashian, S. (2012). Redeeming the Past: My Journey from Freedom Fighter to Healer. New York: Orbis. 2012. ISBN 978-1-60833-227-4. (Note: Redeeming the Past has also been published in the Bosnian language, German, Sinhalese, Spanish, Japanese. In 2015 it will be published in Afrikaans, French and Tamil.)

=== Contributions ===
- What Apartheid Has Done to All of Us, Black and White. American Committee on Africa. 1991.
- Begegnungen mit Father Michael Lapsley SSM anläßlich des Jahresfestes des Nordelbischen Missionszentrums in Breklum vom 21. - 23. Juni 2002. Nordelbisches Missionszentrum. 2002.
- Confronting the Past and Creating the Future: The Redemptive Value of Truth Telling". Social Research 65 (4): 741–758. Winter 1998. JSTOR 40971285.
- H. Russel Botman; Robin M. Petersen, eds. (1996). "Bearing the pain in our bodies". To Remember and to Heal: Theological and Psychological Reflections on Truth and Reconciliation. Human & Rousseau. pp. 17–24. ISBN 978-0-7981-3644-0.
- "The Journey to and from Apology: Restoring the Moral Order", Journal For Social Research: An International Quarterly, Winter 2020.
- "Tutu and Me: Perspectives on brokenness and wholeness", Ecumenical Encounters with Desmond Mpilo Tutu, UWC Press ISBN 978-1-990995-06-4. 2021
- The Role of Faith Communities in moral regeneration: a time for introspection in Leadership Magazine July 2021.
- Healing old wounds of Women and Men to end gender based violence and femicide in Leadership Magazine August 2021
- The Pain caused by the demonization of African culture at the altar of Apartheid and Colonization in Leadership Magazine November 2021.
- The ANC's Church Front in International Brigade against Apartheid: Secrets of the People's War that Liberated ]South Africa Jacana 2021 ISBN 978-1-4314-3202-8 December 2021

== See also ==
- Desmond Tutu
- Albie Sachs
- John Osmers
