= Building, Construction and Allied Workers' Union =

Trade union in South Africa

The Building, Construction and Allied Workers' Union (BCAWU) is a trade union representing workers in the construction industry in South Africa.

The union was founded in 1975 to represent black workers in the industry. It affiliated to the Black Consultative Committee, and then to the Council of Unions of South Africa. It had 9,200 members by 1981, growing to 27,264 in 1986, with a particular strength around Gauteng, where it was the leading union in the industry.

In 1986, the union affiliated to the new National Council of Trade Unions (NACTU), of which it remains a member. By 2011, it had about 47,000 members.
