= Federal Council of Retail and Allied Workers =

South African trade union

The Federal Council of Retail and Allied Workers (FEDCRAW) is a trade union representing workers in the retail sector in South Africa.

The union was founded on 8 August 1984 as a split from the Commercial Catering and Allied Workers' Union of South Africa, led by officials who were employed at Edgars in Dobsonville. It soon expanded to cover other shops, and by 1987, it had 4,000 members. It registered with the government in 1993, and affiliated with both the National Council of Trade Unions and the Confederation of South African Workers' Unions.
