= Jacob Mabena =

South African politician

Jacob Israel Mabena (born 21 May 1959) is a South African politician, businessman and former trade unionist who represented the African National Congress (ANC) in the Mpumalanga Provincial Legislature and Mpumalanga Executive Council until 2005, when he was fired from the Executive Council by Premier Thabang Makwetla. He is also a former president of the Chemical, Energy, Paper, Printing, Wood and Allied Workers' Union and a former provincial secretary of the Congress of South African Trade Unions in the Eastern Transvaal.

== Political career ==
In the 1990s, Mabena was a regional leader in the African National Congress (ANC) and the allied Congress of South African Trade Unions (Cosatu). He was provincial general secretary of Cosatu in the Eastern Transvaal from 1990 to 1992. After the end of apartheid in 1994, he joined the Mpumalanga Provincial Legislature and Mpumalanga Executive Council.

He was appointed to his final government office shortly after the 2004 general election on 3 May 2004, when Premier Thabang Makwetla named him as Member of the Executive Council (MEC) for Economic Development and Planning. He remained in that office until 17 January 2005, when Makwetla announced that he had fired Mabena and replaced him with William Lubisi. Mabena said that he had heard about his dismissal in the media and had not been given an explanation for Makwetla's decision. Although Mabena was entitled to serve the remainder of the legislative term as an ordinary Member of the Provincial Legislature, he resigned from politics later in 2005.

However, he remained active in the Chemical, Energy, Paper, Printing, Wood and Allied Workers' Union (Ceppwawu), a Cosatu affiliate. He was Ceppwawu's president at the time of his dismissal from the Executive Council and he was re-elected to that position in August 2008, although his term in office was marred by divisions between himself and Ceppwawu deputy general secretary Thabani Mdlalose. He also launched a wind turbine manufacturing company, Adventure Power, based in Centurion.
