= Food and Beverage Workers' Union =

Trade union in South Africa

The Food and Beverage Workers' Union was a trade union representing workers in the food processing industry in South Africa.

The union was established in 1979 by Skakes Sikhakhane, after he had lost re-election as general secretary of the Sweet, Food and Allied Workers' Union. In 1980, it was a founding affiliate of the Council of Unions of South Africa, and by the following year, it had 6,000 members. By 1986, when it transferred to the new National Council of Trade Unions, it had grown to 16,124 members. In 1993, it merged with the National Union of Wine, Spirits and Allied Workers, to form the National Union of Food, Beverage, Wine, Spirit and Allied Workers.
