= Electrical and Allied Workers' Trade Union of South Africa =

Trade union in South Africa

The Electrical and Allied Workers' Trade Union of South Africa (EAWTUSA) was a trade union representing electricians in South Africa.

The union was established in 1987, when the Electrical and Allied Workers' Union of South Africa, representing black workers, merged with the Electrical and Allied Trade Union of South Africa, representing "coloured" workers. The South African Electrical Workers' Association, representing white workers, also took part in the negotiations, but some of its members were strongly opposed to a merger, and it did not join. The union affiliated to the National Council of Trade Unions.

The new union took part in numerous strikes, including major actions at Plessey and National Panasonic. In May 1989, the union merged with the Electronic and Electrical Workers' Union, the Engineering and Allied Workers' Union and the United Automobile and Motor Workers' Union, to form the Metal and Electrical Workers' Union of South Africa.
