= Chemical, Energy, Paper, Printing, Wood and Allied Workers' Union =

Trade union in South Africa

CEPPWAWU
- Chemical, Energy, Paper, Printing, Wood and Allied Workers' Union
- Founded: 1999
- Headquarters: Johannesburg, Gauteng
- Location: South Africa
- Members: 67,000
- Key people: Welile Nolingo (general secretary)
- Affiliations: COSATU, WFTU
- Website: www.ceppwawu.org

The Chemical, Energy, Paper, Printing, Wood and Allied Workers' Union (CEPPWAWU) is a trade union representing workers in various industries in South Africa.

The union was formed through the merger of the Chemical Workers' Industrial Union (CWIU) and the Paper, Printing, Wood and Allied Workers' Union (PPWAWU) in 1999. At the time of the merger, the union had 93,000 members, which had fallen to 64,100 members by 2011.

CEPPWAWU is an affiliate of the Congress of South African Trade Unions (COSATU).

== Leadership ==
=== General Secretaries ===
1999: Muzi Buthelezi
2002: Welile Nolingo

=== Presidents ===
1999: Pasco Dyani
2008: Jacob Mabena
2011: Thamsanqa Mhlongo
