= African Teachers' Association of South Africa =

Trade union in South Africa

The African Teachers' Association of South Africa (ATASA) was a trade union representing black teachers in South Africa.

The union was founded in 1919, as the South African Native Teachers' Federation, a loose federation of regional teachers' unions. It focused on increasing wages, and encouraging teachers to obtain higher qualifications. In 1973, it became the first South African union to affiliate to the World Confederation of Organizations of the Teaching Profession. It opposed the compulsory teaching of Afrikaans in black schools. However, it was increasingly seen as close to the Government of South Africa, and was opposed by many younger teachers. In 1976, its offices were destroyed in an arson attack, blamed on anti-apartheid activists.

The union participated in the 1990 negotiations which formed the South African Democratic Teachers Union, but instead affiliated to the loose National Professional Teachers' Organisation of South Africa (NAPTOSA). In 2006, it became an integral part of NAPTOSA.
