= Lynette Denny =

South African gynaecologic oncologist (1958–2024)

Lynette Denny GCOB FRCOG
- Born: Lynette Ann Denny; 13 January 1958; Pretoria, South Africa
- Died: 9 June 2024 (aged 66); Cape Town, South Africa
- Occupations: Head of obstetrics and gynaecology Specialist physician
- Title: Professor

Academic background
- Education: University of Cape Town

Academic work
- Discipline: Obstetrics and gynaecology
- Sub-discipline: Gynaecologic oncology
- Institutions: University of Cape Town; Groote Schuur Hospital
- Main interests: Cervical cancer prevention Cervical cancer screening

Lynette Ann Denny GCOB FRCOG (30 January 1958 – 9 June 2024) was a South African gynaecologic oncologist who specialised in the prevention of cervical cancer in low-resource settings. She worked at the University of Cape Town throughout her career.

At the university, Denny was a specialist physician at the Groote Schuur Hospital, the head of the obstetrics and gynaecology department, and the founding director of the South African Medical Research Council Gynaecological Cancer Research Centre. However, she was best known for her role in founding and running the Khayelitsha Cervical Cancer Screening Project in Khayelitsha, Cape Town, where she conducted community-based research on low-cost alternatives to pap smears.

== Early life and education ==
Denny was born on 30 January 1958 in Pretoria, then part of South Africa's Transvaal Province. She grew up in Durban with four siblings. As a child she was influenced by her perception of the injustices of apartheid, and she later said that she viewed her community service as a way of making reparations for her white privilege.

After high school, she moved to Cape Town to study medicine at the University of Cape Town (UCT). She graduated in 1983 with an MBChB and remained at UCT for specialist training, undertaken over the next decade at Groote Schuur Hospital. She was a registrar in the hospital's obstetrics and gynaecology unit and also undertook subspecialty training as a senior registrar in gynaecologic oncology. Afterwards, while in practice, she completed an MMed in 1994 and a PhD in obstetrics and gynaecology in 2000.

== Medical career ==
In February 1994, Denny was hired at Groote Schuur as a specialist, and she was promoted through the ranks to senior specialist in 1997, principal specialist in 2007, and chief specialist in 2010. In addition she was head of UCT's Department of Obstetrics and Gynaecology between 2013 and 2022. During that period, in 2015, Denny became the inaugural director of UCT's Gynaecological Cancer Research Centre, which focused on both clinical and basic science research into gynaecological cancers and which was founded with a sizeable grant from the South African Medical Research Council.

After her retirement in April 2022, Denny remained at the UCT Department of Obstetrics and Gynaecology as professor with responsibility for special projects. She was also chief specialist at Groote Schuur until her death.

=== Cervical cancer screening ===
In 1995, with collaborators at Columbia University, Denny established a cervical cancer screening programme in Khayelitsha, a township on the outskirts of Cape Town. The Khayelitsha Cervical Cancer Screening Project began operating from a single mobile caravan in Site B, Khayelitsha, and its aim was to conduct community-based research on the efficacy of alternatives to pap smears in screening for cervical cancer. She said that she had become interested in such work during her subspecialty training at Groote Schuur, where she had often seen black women suffer from preventible advanced cervical cancers because of inadequate screening.

Over the next 20 years the project moved to permanent premises and became an established health centre, receiving funding from the American National Institutes of Health, among others. By 2024 it had screened more than 60,000 women. In addition to undertaking cross-sectional studies of cervical screening methods, Denny pioneered the "screen and treat" protocol, which combined screening via human papillomavirus (HPV) DNA testing with ablative cryotherapy treatment of precancerous lesions, in the same clinic visit. Towards the end of her career, her research group also incorporated artificial intelligence into screening methods. She was a member of the group of experts that helped devise the World Health Organisation guidelines for the secondary prevention of cervical cancer and use of HPV testing as a primary screening test.

=== Other activities ===
A committed feminist, Denny had a particular interest in women's health in the context of gender-based violence. In South African policymaking, she was involved in the Thuthuzela Care Centres initiative and in the drafting of the first comprehensive South African protocol for the treatment of rape survivors. She was a former chairperson of the non-profit organisation Rape Crisis, and through the Abortion Reform Action Group she advocated for the liberalisation of South African abortion law in the early post-apartheid period.

Denny was also the secretary and treasurer of the African Organisation for Research and Training in Cancer from 2004 to 2017, the president of the International Gynecologic Cancer Society from 2012 to 2014, a co-founder of the Pan African Women's Association of Surgeons, and a former chairperson of the gynaecologic oncology committee of the International Federation of Gynaecology and Obstetrics. In addition to serving as an advisor to the Lancet Commission on Women, Power and Cancer, she was appointed by the International Atomic Energy Agency as an international expert to advise on the development of Botswana's national cancer control programme. She published frequently and the National Research Foundation rated her as a B2 researcher.

== Honours ==
At an early stage of her career, in 2004, Denny was admitted to the Order of the Disa by Marthinus van Schalkwyk, the Premier of the Western Cape. In the same year she received the inaugural Shoprite–Checkers–SABC2 South African Women of the Year award in the category of science and technology, and in 2006 the Department of Science and Technology gave her the Distinguished Scientist Award at the Women in Science Awards. She went on to receive the South African Medical Association's 2012 Extraordinary Service to Medicine Award, British Society for Colposcopy and Cervical Pathology's 2014 Founders' Medal, the Cancer Association of South Africa's 2015 Oettle Memorial Medal, the 2015 International Federation of Gynaecology and Obstetrics Award, the International Agency for Research on Cancer's 2016 Medal of Honour, the International Gynecologic Cancer Society's 2016 Global Humanitarian Award for "community advancement in resource-limited settings", and the South African Medical Research Council's 2019 Gold Medal for her research on cervical cancer.

On 10 November 2021, President Cyril Ramaphosa announced that Denny would be admitted to the Order of the Baobab in Silver for her contribution to obstetrics. She received the award in a ceremony on 18 November. On 10 August 2022, the day after Women's Day, UCT's Faculty of Health Sciences hosted a special thanksgiving celebration in Denny's honour, with speakers including the Health Sciences Dean, Lionel Green-Thompson, and UCT Vice-Chancellors Mamokgethi Phakeng and Mamphela Ramphele. Later that year, in November, she received the South African Society of Obstetrics and Gynaecology's Lifetime Achievement Award. She was also fellow ad eundem of the British Royal College of Obstetricians and Gynaecologists since 2012.

== Personal life and death ==
Denny lived in Green Point, Cape Town. She was diagnosed with breast cancer in 2011, and after treatment the cancer reoccurred in her spine in 2020. She said in late 2021 that, "Essentially, I have advanced notice of things coming to an end. So I'm getting my life in order." She died on 9 June 2024, aged 66.
