= Michael Worsnip =

South African theologian

- Born: 1950 (age 74–75)
- Citizenship: South Africa
- Occupation: Writer

Michael Worsnip is a South African Anglican theologian. He is author of several books, most notably Between the Two Fires - the Anglican Church in South Africa 1948 -1957; the book Priest and Partisan: A South African journey on anti-Apartheid activist and fellow Anglican priest, Father Michael Lapsley; the novel Remittance Man. He was formerly the Secretary General of the Lesotho Council of churches and was deported from South Africa after giving an interview to the BBC.

He is currently Managing Director of Maropeng, the official visitor center to the Cradle of Humankind World Heritage Site and was Land Claims Commissioner for the Western Cape, he has previously been involved in Land and Housing in South Africa.

== Publications ==
Worsnip's publications include:

- Church of the Province of South Africa and the Formation of a Social Conscience 1948-1957: with Particular Emphasis on the Thought of Geoffrey Hare Clayton. University of Manchester. 1985.
- South Africa's National Security State and the Churches. Federal Theological Seminary. 1988.
- Between the two fires: the Anglican Church and apartheid : 1948-1957. University of Natal Press. 1991. ISBN 978-0-86980-795-8.
- We shall overcome: a spirituality of liberation. Cluster Publications. 1991. ISBN 978-0-9583141-2-1. with Desmond van der Water.
- Priest and Partisan: A South African Journey. Ocean Press. 1996. ISBN 978-1-875284-96-2.
- Low Intensity Conflict and the South African Church. IDASA. 1989.
- Remittance Man. University of KwaZulu-Natal Press. 2007. ISBN 978-1-86914-115-8.
