= Democratised Transport Logistics and Allied Workers' Union =

Trade union in South Africa

The Democratised Transport Logistics and Allied Workers Union (DETAWU) is a trade union representing workers in the transportation and logistics industries in South Africa.

The union was founded in 2015, as a split from the South African Transport and Allied Workers Union (SATAWU). It argued that SATAWU lacked internal democracy and was mismanaging its finances. In 2017, the union was a founding affiliate of the South African Federation of Trade Unions. By 2018, it had about 10,000 members.
