= Suid-Afrikaanse Onderwysers Unie =

Trade union in South Africa

The Suid-Afrikaanse Onderwysers Unie (SAOU), sometimes translated as the South African Teachers' Union, is a trade union representing principally Afrikaans-speaking teachers in South Africa.

The union was founded in 1905 to represent Afrikaans-speaking white teachers in the Cape Province. It aimed to improve the pay and working conditions of teachers, to promote education in general, and the use of the Afrikaans language. It did not participate in the anti-apartheid movement.

In 1991, the union affiliated to the National Professional Teachers' Organisation of South Africa (NAPTOSA), a loose federation. However, in July 1996, it absorbed NAPTOSA's other Afrikaans-speaking affiliates, the Natal Onderwysunie and Onderwysunie van die Oranje Vrystaat, and resigned from NAPTOSA. It initially focused its campaigns on preserving exclusively Afrikaans-speaking schools. The union decided to work more closely with the mainstream trade union movement, and affiliated to the Federation of Unions of South Africa. In 2002, it had 41,315 members, falling to 32,029 in 2011. The union works with NAPTOSA, the Natal Association of Teachers' Unions and the Professional Educators' Union in the Combined Trade Unions, for the purpose of recognition by the Education Labour Relations Chamber.
