= HOTELICCA =

Trade union in South Africa

HOTELICCA is a general union in South Africa.

The union was founded in 1978, as the Hotel, Liquor and Catering Trade Workers' Union. In 1980, it broadened its remit and became the Hotel, Liquor, Catering and Allied Workers' Union of South Africa (HOTELICA). By 1981, it had 2,300 members.

The union was affiliated to the Council of Unions of South Africa, but in 1984 it switched to the new Azanian Confederation of Trade Unions. By 1986, it had grown to 10,000 members.

The union was a founding affiliate of the National Council of Trade Unions, as the Hotel, Liquor, Catering, Commercial And Allied Workers Union of South Africa (HOTELICCA). By 2011, it had around 6,000 members. In 2014, it began accepting workers in all sectors, and shortened its name to HOTELICCA.
