= Mary Burton (activist) =

South African activist

Mary Burton OLS
- Born: Maria Macdiarmid Ingouville; January 19, 1940 (age 86); Buenos Aires, Argentina
- Occupation: political activist
- Spouse: Geoffrey Burton
- Children: four sons
- Parent(s): Molly and Peter Ingouville

Maria Macdiarmid "Mary" Burton OLS (born 19 January 1940, Buenos Aires, Argentina) is a South African activist, former president of the Black Sash and was a commissioner on the Truth and Reconciliation Commission.

== Early life ==
Burton is one of three children of Molly and Peter Ingouville. She was born in Buenos Aires but moved to Brazil when her father was transferred there in 1952. She attended schools in Argentina and Brazil, before spending two years studying languages in Europe. After leaving school she worked as a journalist at the Times of Brazil in São Paulo. In 1958 she met Geoffrey Burton while skiing in Austria. They married in Brazil in 1961 and moved to his native South Africa.

== Political activism ==
She became involved with the Black Sash in 1965 and was chair of the organisation's Western Cape regional council from 1974 to 1986. During this time she also studied at the University of Cape Town, graduating with a BA degree in 1982. She was arrested after a protest march to Pollsmoor Prison in 1985. She then became president of the organisation until 1990, and again from 1994 to 1995. Nelson Mandela appointed her as one of the 17 individuals to sit on the Truth and Reconciliation Commission. She was involved in the ‘Home for All Campaign’ in 2000 which called for those who had benefited under Apartheid to contribute to reconciliation. She was formerly a member of the Council of the University of Cape Town, and a past president of UCT's Convocation. She remains the patron of the Black Sash.

== Recognition ==
She was honoured with South Africa's Order of Luthuli (silver) in 2003. In 2004 the Western Cape government conferred on her the Order of the Disa. Also in 2004 the Institute for Justice and Reconciliation awarded her the Reconciliation Award. She received an honorary doctorate from the University of Cape Town in Social Science in 2011. In 2020 Rhodes University awarded her an honorary doctorate in Laws.

== Writings ==
- Burton, Mary Ingouville (2015). The Black Sash : women for justice and peace. Auckland Park, South Africa. ISBN 978-1-4314-2228-9. OCLC 920465013.
- Burton, Mary Ingouville (2017). The Truth and Reconciliation Commission. Athens, Ohio. ISBN 978-0-8214-2278-6. OCLC 1004670148.
