= South African Railways and Harbours Union =

South African trade union

The South African Railways and Harbours Union was formed by black workers of the South African Railways and Harbours Administration after they had been expelled from the National Union of Railway and Harbour Servants.

== Formation ==
Rachel Simons, then known as Ray Alexander, played a significant part in setting up the organisation, and was helped by Johnny Gomas, the General Secretary of the Cape Town Stevedoring Workers Union. It was launched at a meeting on 26 March 1936 where Willy Driver was elected Secretary. By July 1936 it had 1300 members. Its first conference, attended by 26 delegates, was held in Cape Town on 3 and 4 August 1936. It decided to affiliate to the International Trade Union Committee of Negro Workers and the South African Trades and Labour Council. As Africans could not rent premises in towns it operated from the premises of the Cape Town Stevedoring Workers Union at 57 Plein Street, which was rented in the name of White members of the South African Communist Party. The Union submitted grievances to the management of the South African Railways and Harbours Administration, but were not allowed to negotiate.

In 1937 Ray Alexander produced a pamphlet for the union called "We Want to Live". It pointed out that the Cape Town City Council paid its labourers 6/8d a day but railway workers were only paid 3/6d or 4/-d a day. In Bloemfontein there was a general minimum wage of 3/6d a day but this did not apply to railway workers, who were paid less. The average wage of the 28,000 casual labourers was less than £32 a year - less than the average wage of black workers in 1920. Many black staff had no definite hours of work, but were required to be available as required. African workers only got 3 days paid holiday a year (Good Friday, Christmas Day and Union Day).

The union joined the Council of Non-European Trade Unions when it was established in November 1941.

Sarah Carneson was general secretary in 1945.

== Organisation ==
From 1942 to the 1950s the union had an advantage because of labour shortages and succeeded in negotiating improvements.

Mtini employed Archie Sibeko as the union's first full-time organiser, working out of a corner of the Non European Laundry Workers Union office in Cape Town in or around 1953. The union's operations at that time were almost completely clandestine. Sibeko wore the uniform brown overalls so that he would be inconspicuous on railway property. Until he was banned Ben Turok worked closely with him and took up cases using his position as a member of the Cape Provincial Council. If a strike was organised large numbers of workers were arrested and taken to court. The union organised for each one to give evidence individually about why they stopped work, and this usually led to prosecutions being withdrawn. Those who were known to be active in the union were routinely transferred to remote areas with reduced wages. Union organisers found on railway property were prosecuted for trespass. After an unsuccessful strike in Port Elizabeth in 1957, defeated by the use of prison labour, the railways strikers all dismissed. The stevedores were retained but their wages were reduced.

Lawrence Ndzanga was the union's organiser in Johannesburg, working with his wife Rita who worked for the union as a typist. He was elected National President of the union in September 1962. Moses Mabhida was also a full-time organiser, paid £25 a month.

It was a founder member of the South African Congress of Trade Unions in 1955.

== Suppression ==
A number of the union's organisers, including Sibeko, were arrested on at 4 am 5 December 1956 among those charged in the 1956 Treason Trial, which continued until 1961.

The union organised a strike at the end of May 1961 against the establishment of the Republic of South Africa. In December 1961 the office was infiltrated by an informer. It was raided by the police who took all the membership cards. The General Law Amendment Act of 1962, generally known as the Sabotage Act made organisation very difficult. In December 1962 the South African Congress of Trade Unions was listed in a government proclamation under which 432 people were banned from holding office in any of 36 listed organisations, including 45 officials of SACTU and its affiliates. The General Law Amendment Act, 1963 made life even more difficult. All the officials were detained or banned. Sibeko and Mabhida left the country. There was no open trade union activity for the remainder of the decade. Sam Pholotho became President of the union in 1965, but he too was banned.

== Revival ==
The union was revived in December 1985, operating from Lusaka. It affiliated to the Congress of South African Trade Unions, whose offices it shared, and the United Democratic Front. It held its first national conference at Grahamstown in October 1986, with Sam Pholotho in the chair. Sello Ntai was elected as General Secretary and Justice Langa as president. There were then about 10,000 members.

Its first task was to persuade people to leave the company union, the Black Trade Union of Transnet Workers in order to join SARAHWU. The first campaigns were about the quality of food supplied in the workers compounds. A successful boycott campaign encouraged about 3/4 of the railways workers in the Southern Transvaal to join by the end of 1986.

A strike started at the container depot in City Deep, Gauteng on 16 March 1987 over the sacking of a delivery driver. By the first week of April more than 20,000 were on strike. The strike was supported by other unions, but not by the Black Trade Union of Transnet Workers, and spread across the whole country. On 22 April 3 workers were shot dead and many injured in an incident which became known as the Germiston massacre. There were many violent incidents, including the burning of trains at Orlando Power Station and the murder of strike breakers. The government retaliated by attacking both the union and the Congress of South African Trade Unions. Most of the union leadership were arrested. On 7 May there were two explosions at COSATU House which destroyed all the unions membership files and equipment. A settlement was agreed on 5 June which could be presented as a union victory, although the union was still not recognised.

By 1988 membership had grown to around 43,000. There was still no checkoff system. The union refused to apply for registration because that would imply acceptance of a "blacks only" union. There were 18 offices across the country with about 55 employees, and there was often not enough money to pay them.

In October 1988 annual congress Martin Sebakwane was elected General Secretary.

In November 1989 there was a further strike as a result of which, in January 1990, Transnet (newly formed) agreed to recognise the union and to derecognise the Black Trade Union of Transnet Workers. Several people were killed - again at Germiston - and over 5000 employees sacked. The rail lines at the port of Durban were sabotaged. The union agreed to be registered and the recognition agreement was signed on 1 November 1990.

The third annual congress was held from 27 February to 2 March 1991. For the first time the Coloured and Indian unions in Transnet were invited guests. From October 1991 the union could participate in the new Transnet Industrial Council. In September there were proposals for a strike. Transnet made an offer which was accepted by Sebakwane on 29 September 1991 without consulting the unions full negotiating team. The Southern Transvaal shop stewards objected and they occupied the unions office and later kidnapped Sebakwane. Sibeko, who had been elected Honorary President, was brought in to run the head office for several months. COSATU conducted a Commission of Enquiry which reported in January 1992. They found no evidence of corruption, as had been alleged, but considerable evidence of abuse and misuse of union funds and facilities.

After this Derrick Simoko was elected General Secretary. Sebakwane stepped down and became a trainee manager for Transnet.

The liberation of freedom fighters and the Government of National Unity was a challenge for the union. Its organisers were political activists rather than administrators. A number of organisers were accused of irregularities and forced to resign. Salaries were not always paid on time even as late as 1997. Furthermore, the new government were not prepared to continue to subsidise the transport industry and the numbers employed declined significantly.

By 1998 membership had fallen to 35,000.

A merger was eventually negotiated with the Black Trade Union of Transnet Workers and the smaller Transnet Allied Trade Union. The merged organisation was called the South African Transport and Allied Workers Union (SATAWU) and was launched at a special congress on 16 December 1998. On 18 May 2000, it merged with the Transport and General Workers' Union to form a new union, also named SATAWU.

== Leadership ==
=== General Secretaries ===
1936: Willy Driver
1945: Sarah Carneson
1956: John Noako
Johnny Mtini
Greenwood Ngotyana
Archie Sibeko
1986: Sello Ntai
1988: Martin Sebakwane
1992: Derrick Simoko

=== Presidents ===
1962: Lawrence Ndzanga
1965: Sam Pholotho
1986: Justice Langa
1992: Nelson Ndinisa
