= National Union of Food, Beverage, Wine, Spirit and Allied Workers =

Trade union in South Africa

The National Union of Food, Beverage, Wine, Spirit and Allied Workers (NUFBWSAW) is a trade union representing workers in the food and drink processing industry in South Africa.

The union was established in 1993, when the Food and Beverage Workers' Union merged with the National Union of Wine, Spirits and Allied Workers. Like both its predecessors, it affiliated to the National Council of Trade Unions. By 1995, it claimed 20,000 members.
