= Transport and Allied Workers' Union =

Trade union in South Africa

The Transport and Allied Workers' Union of South Africa (TAWUSA) is a trade union representing workers in the transport sector in South Africa.

The union was established in 1972 to represent black workers in the industry. In 1980, it was a founding affiliate of the Council of Unions of South Africa, and it grew from 8,183 members in 1981, to 23,327 in 1986. It was particularly strong among bus workers in Gauteng, and in Lebowa, Bophuthatswana and QwaQwa.

In 1986, the union became part of the new National Council of Trade Unions, to which it remains affiliated.
