= Democratic Municipal and Allied Workers' Union of South Africa =

Trade union in South Africa

The Democratic Municipal and Allied Workers' Union of South Africa (DEMAWUSA) is a trade union representing workers employed by local authorities and state governments in South Africa.

The union was founded in 2015, as a split from the South African Municipal Workers Union. In 2017, it was a founding affiliate of the South African Federation of Trade Unions (SAFTU), and as of 2020, it had about 12,000 members.

In 2019, the union held a strike ballot among Metrobus workers in Johannesburg. Although it stated that the ballot was conducted in secret, the Government of South Africa claimed that it was unable to prove this, and that as a result, it should be deregistered. The union appealed this deregistration order, arguing that SAFTU affiliates were being unfairly targeted by the government.

In 2021, the union was considering a merger with the Municipal and Allied Trade Union of South Africa, another SAFTU affiliate, with a similar history.
