= National Transport Movement =

Trade union in South Africa

The National Transport Movement (NTM) is a trade union representing workers in the transportation sector in South Africa.

The union was founded in 2012 as a split from the South African Transport and Allied Workers Union (SATAWU). Its leader, Ephraim Mphahlela, had formerly been president of SATAWU, and he brought with him about half of SATAWU's total membership. In 2013, the union affiliated to the National Council of Trade Unions, but in 2017 it moved to join the new South African Federation of Trade Unions (SAFTU). However, in 2018, the union left SAFTU and became entirely independent. SAFTU claimed that this was due to corruption charges against Mphahlela. At the time, it had around 52,250 members.

In 2018, the union won a major case against Prasa, leading to the reinstatement of 700 of its members who had been sacked five years earlier.
