= Kwezana =

- Location within Eastern Cape Location within South Africa
- Coordinates: 32.704°S 26.925°E
- Country: South Africa
- Province: Eastern Cape
- District: Amathole
- Municipality: Raymond Mhlaba

Area
  - Total: 0.41 km^{2} (0.16 sq mi)

Population (2011)
  - Total: 452
  - Density: 1,100/km^{2} (2,900/sq mi)

Racial makeup (2011)
  - Black African: 99.6%
  - Indian/Asian: 0.4%

First languages (2011)
  - Xhosa: 98.9%
  - English: 1.1%
- Time zone: UTC+2 (SAST)

Kwezana is a village near Alice in the Tyume River valley.

It is the birthplace of Archibald 'Archie' Mncedisi Sibeko, and he gives an account of life in the village in the 1930s in his book. At that time there were about 18 homesteads in the village, each consisting of a number of rondavels with walls made of wood and mud and roofs with a wooden frame, thatched with grass. One would be the kitchen and others used for sleeping. There was a separate basketwork tower for storing food. Each family had its own kraal and the old kraals had an underground storage cellar to store maize. There were no toilets of any kind. The village was almost self-sufficient. Some families has Singer sewing machines and gramophones. There were no telephones or electricity.

The Mimosa tree is very common in the area and was used as a fencing material.

There was a primary school in the village which took children up to standard 5. There were three teachers. When Sibeko started the school did not have its own building, but a school made of two rondavels was built with money raised in the village while he was there, and the buildings were still standing in 1990, though no longer used as a classroom.
