= South African Federation of Trade Unions =

South African trade union federation

SAFTU
- South African Federation of Trade Unions
- Founded: 21 April 2017
- Location: South Africa
- Members: 800,000
- Key people: Zwelinzima Vavi, General Secretary; Mac Chavalala, President; Nomvume Ralarala, first Deputy president Thabo Matsose, Second Deputy President
- Website: SAFTU.org.za

The South African Federation of Trade Unions (SAFTU) is a socialist trade union federation in South Africa. It was founded in 2017, and is the second largest of the country's main trade union confederations, with 21 affiliated trade unions organising 800,000 workers.

== Politics ==
The federation describes its key political principles as worker control and democracy, anti-imperialism and socialism.

== Affiliates ==
=== Current affiliates ===
The following unions were affiliated in 2021:

Union	Abbreviation	Founded	Membership (2018)
Academic and Professional Staff Association	APSA	1997	
Chemical, Wood and Allied Workers' Union	CWAWU	2010	
Commercial, Stevedoring, Agricultural and Allied Workers' Union	CSAAWU	2007	
Democratic Municipal and Allied Workers' Union of South Africa	DEMAWUSA	2015	12,000
Democratic Postal and Communications' Union	DEPACU	2014	
Democratised Transport Logistics and Allied Workers' Union	DETAWU	2015	10,000
Food and Allied Workers Union	FAWU	1986	23,300
General Industries Workers' Union of South Africa	GIWUSA	1989	21,500
Information Communication Technology Union	ICTU	2012	
Municipal and Allied Trade Union of South Africa	MATUSA	2015	
National Union of Metalworkers of South Africa	NUMSA	1987	328,827
National Union of Public Service and Allied Workers	NUPSAW	1998	48,000
South African Correctional Services Workers' Union	SACOSWU	2009	
South African Industrial, Commercial and Allied Workers' Union	SAICWU	2016	
Tirisano Transport and Services Workers' Union	TASWU	2004	
Transport, Retail and General Workers' Union	THORN	2010	

=== Former affiliates ===
Union	Abbreviation	Founded	Left	Reason not affiliated	Membership (2018)
National Transport Movement	NTM	2012	2018	Disaffiliated	52,250
Private Schools and Allied Workers' Union	PRISAWU	2015			
South African Policing Union	SAPU	1996			
Finance Union of Workers	FUWO				
South African Liberated Public Sector Workers' Union	SALIPSWU	2015			
Finance Union of Workers	FUWO				
Young Nurses Indaba Trade Union	YNITU				
