= Professional Educators' Union =

Trade union in South Africa

The Professional Educators' Union (PEU) is a trade union representing education workers in South Africa.

The union was founded in 1919, when the Northern Transvaal Native Teachers' Association merged with the Southern Transvaal Native Teachers' Association, to form the Transvaal African Teachers' Association. It later renamed itself as the Transvaal African Teachers' Association.

In 1949, Hendrik Verwoerd, the recently elected National Party's Minister of Native Affairs, proposed what became the Bantu Education Act, 1953, formalising apartheid in education. TATA, together with other teachers' organisations in the Cape, the Free State and Natal, strongly opposed it. More conservative teachers in rural areas broke away to form the rival Transvaal African Teachers' Union. TATA elected a new, radical, leadership, including Zephania Mothopeng as president, but along with Eskia Mphahlele and Isaac Matlare, he was dismissed from teaching in 1952. The union reunited with TATU in 1957, as the Transvaal United African Teachers' Association', under a more cautious leadership.

By 1984, the union was able to employ its first full-time member of staff, Matshidiso Lizzy Tshabalala, who served as general secretary until 2018. By 1990, the union had 35,000 members. It participated in negotiation around the formation of the South African Democratic Teachers Union, but decided to remain independent. In 1998, it renamed itself as the "Professional Education Union".

In 1997, the union affiliated to the National Professional Teachers' Organisation of South Africa (NAPTOSA), a loose federation, but when in 2006 this became a more centralised union, the PEU remained independent. It works with NAPTOSA, the Natal Association of Teachers' Unions and the Suid-Afrikaanse Onderwysers Unie in the Combined Trade Unions, for the purpose of recognition by the Education Labour Relations Chamber. It is also an affiliate of the National Council of Trade Unions. As of 2011, it had about 17,000 members.
