= Azanian Confederation of Trade Unions =

1984–1986 trade union in South Africa

The Azanian Confederation of Trade Unions (AZACTU) was a national trade union federation in South Africa.

The federation was established in 1984, with eight affiliates, representing a total of 75,000 black workers. These formerly independent affiliates had been active in numerous strikes in 1983 and 1984. The federation was independent of the Azanian People's Organisation, although that party had helped set up several of the affiliates.

In 1985, the federation began discussing a merger with the Council of Unions of South Africa. Although initial discussions fell through, on 5 October 1986 a merger was completed, forming the National Council of Trade Unions.

== Affiliates ==
Union	Abbreviation	Founded	Left	Reason left	Membership (1986)
African Allied Workers' Union	AAWU	1982			2,200
Amalgamated Black Workers' Union	ABWU				N/A
Black Allied Mining and Construction Workers' Union	BAMACWU		1986	Transferred to NACTU	32,000
Black Domestic Workers' Union	BDWU	1985	1986	Transferred to NACTU	14,000
Black Electronic and Electrical Workers' Union	BEEWU		1986	Transferred to NACTU	2,001
Black General Workers' Union	BLAGWU	1983	1986	Dissolved	5,030
Engineering and Allied Workers' Union	EAWUSA	1963	1986	Transferred to NACTU	3,000
Hotel, Liquor, Catering and Allied Workers' Union	HOTELICA	1981	1986	Transferred to NACTU	10,000
Insurance and Assurance Workers' Union of South Africa	IAWUSA		1986	Transferred to NACTU	30,000
National Union of Workers of South Africa	NUWSA				1,500
