= Cape Town Stevedoring Workers Union =

Defunct South African trades union

- Location: Cape Town, South Africa
- Secretary: James Schuba (fl. 1929); Johnny Gomas (fl. 1935)

The Cape Town Stevedoring Workers Union was a South African Trades Union.

In 1929 James Schuba was the secretary of the union. He recruited Rachel Simons to assist him, though she was then only 15. In 1935 Johnny Gomas was the secretary.
