= Adam Small =

South African writer (1936–2016)

- Born: 21 December 1936; Wellington, South Africa
- Died: 25 June 2016 (aged 79); Cape Town, South Africa
- Occupation: Writer
- Known for: Poetry

Adam Small (21 December 1936 – 25 June 2016) was a South African writer who was involved in the Black Consciousness Movement and other activism. He was noted as a Coloured writer who wrote works in Afrikaans that dealt with racial discrimination and satirized the political situation. Some collections include English poems, and he translated the Afrikaans poet N P van Wyk Louw into English.

== Life ==
Adam Small was born on 21 December 1936 in Wellington. He matriculated in 1953 at the St Columbas High School in Athlone on the Cape Flats. He then attended the University of Cape Town where he studied for a degree in Languages and Philosophy. In 1963 he completed an MA (cum laude) in the philosophy of Nicolai Hartmann and Friedrich Nietzsche. During the same time period he studied at the University of London and the University of Oxford.

Adam became a lecturer in philosophy at the University of Fort Hare in 1959, and in 1960 he was one of the academic founders of the University of the Western Cape (UWC) when he was appointed as the Head of the Philosophy Department. In the early 1970s he joined the Black Consciousness Movement.

In 1973 he was pressured to resign from the UWC. This prompted a move to Johannesburg, where he became the Head of Student Body Services at the University of the Witwatersrand (Wits). He returned to Cape Town in 1977, where he was Director of the Western Cape Foundation for Community Services until 1983. In 1984 he returned to the UWC as the Head of the Social Services Department, a position he held until his retirement in 1997.

== Recognition ==
Small was awarded the Hertzog Prize in 2012 for his contribution to the drama genre. Although the award was well received for being long overdue, some controversy arose because the Academy, in making the award, broke one of their own rules stating that the prize can only be awarded to a writer who has published new and substantial work in a specific genre during the previous three years. Small's last play was published in 1983. One of his famous poems is called "Doemanie."

After decades spent out of the public eye, Small, on 14 September 2013, received a hero's welcome at the Breytenbach Centre in Wellington, where he was guest of honour at the centre's Poet Festival. He read a selection of poems from his latest anthology Klawerjas. In 2015 a new drama, Maria, Moeder van God, was broadcast on Radio Sonder Grense's yearly art festival programme.

== Literary style ==
Small is known for his use of the Kaaps Afrikaans dialect, which is primarily associated with lower-class coloured speakers. This choice was attacked by many of his contemporary critics, due to a sense that he was allying himself with (white) Afrikaans interests and that he was allowing the community's specific language to be ridiculed. However, this choice makes him something of a literary pioneer in Afrikaans literary history.

Small was also a member of the Sestigers, an influential South African literary group that was working in the 1960s. This group attempted to revolutionise the dominant literature by questioning the political, racial and sexual problems with the nation.

== Works include ==
- Poems (undated)
- Die Eerste Steen (undated)
- Verse van die Liefde (1957)
- Kitaar My Kruis (1962)
- Sê Sjibbolet (1963)
- A Brown Afrikaner Speaks: A Coloured Poet and Philosopher Looks Ahead (1971)
- Oos West Tuis Best: Distrik Ses (1973, with Chris Jansen)
- Black Bronze Beautiful: Quatrains (1975)
- Oh Wide and Sad Land - Afrikaans Poetry of N P van Wyk Louw translated by Adam Small (1975)
- Kanna hy kô hystoe: 'n drama (1965)
- Klawerjas (2013)
- Maria, Moeder van God, a radiodrama (2015)
