= Sarah Carneson =

South African labour organizer and anti-apartheid activist (1916–2015)

- Born: 17 June 1916; Johannesburg, South Africa
- Died: 30 October 2015 (aged 99)
- Occupations: Labour organizer and anti-apartheid activist
- Spouse: Fred Carneson (m. 1943; died 2000)
- Children: 3

Sarah Carneson (17 June 1916 – 30 October 2015) was a South African labour organizer and anti-apartheid activist.

== Early life ==
Sarah Rubin was born in 1916, in Johannesburg, South Africa, the daughter of Eastern European Jewish immigrants Zelic Rubin (a tailor) and Anna Rubin. Her parents were among the founders of the Communist Party in South Africa, and the younger Rubin joined the Young Communist League as a teenager.

== Career ==
Sarah Rubin worked in the Communist Party offices in Johannesburg, as a young woman, and was a member of the League against Fascism and War. She taught literacy classes for workers, and worked in the party's bookshop, in Johannesburg. From 1936 to 1940, she was involved with labour organizing, with tobacco workers and sugar workers in Durban. In 1945, she became general secretary of the South African Railways and Harbours Union, based in Cape Town.

Sarah and her husband were both banned from public gatherings under the Suppression of Communism Act of 1950. His continued involvement with the Communist Party led to Fred Carneson's arrest and trial in 1956. Sarah Carneson was also detained, in 1960, and paroled to remain, under supervision, in Cape Town. Fred was jailed in 1965, and Sarah left South Africa for England in 1968. In England she continued to work for the trade unions, and at the Morning Star newspaper. The Carnesons were reunited in 1972, in exile in London. The couple returned to South Africa in 1991.

== Personal life ==
Sarah Rubin married Fred Carneson in 1943, while he was still on active duty in World War II. They had three children: Lynn, John, and Ruth. Sarah was widowed when Fred Carneson died in 2000. She died in 2015, aged 99 years, in Muizenberg, Cape Town. A "national memorial event" was held in Cape Town, and attended by leaders of the South African Communist Party, the African National Congress, and Cosatu.

Their daughter Lynn published a biography of the Carnesons, Red in the Rainbow: The Life and Times of Fred and Sarah Carneson (2011). There was a related exhibit about the Carnesons, also titled Red in the Rainbow, at the Slave Lodge Museum in 2015.
