= National Council of Trade Unions =

Trade union in South Africa

NACTU
- National Council of Trade Unions
- Founded: 1986
- Headquarters: Johannesburg, South Africa
- Location: South Africa
- Members: 397,000
- Key people: Narius Moloto, general secretary
- Affiliations: ITUC
- Website: www.nactu.org.za

The National Council of Trade Unions (NACTU) is a national trade union center in South Africa.

== History ==
The federation was formed by the merger of the Council of Unions of South Africa (CUSA) and the Azanian Confederation of Trade Unions (AZACTU) in 1986. In its early years, the federation was strongly influenced by the black consciousness movement, but was divided in its attitude to the African National Congress.

In 1994, the federation affiliated to the International Confederation of Free Trade Unions (ICFTU), the first post-apartheid South African union to do so, and it remains affiliated to its successor, the International Trade Union Confederation. In 2006, the federation began negotiating a merger with the rival Federation of Unions of South Africa. They formed an umbrella organisation, the South African Confederation of Trade Unions, in 2007, but it achieved little, and the two federations remained independent.

In 2001, the newly founded Association of Mineworkers and Construction Union (AMCU) affiliated to NACTU, soon becoming its largest member. AMCU argued that unions should remain independent of political parties, which caused tensions in 2014, when NACTU endorsed the Economic Freedom Fighters and the Pan Africanist Congress of Azania. AMCU resigned in 2017, but the federation's total membership figure of 400,000 has not been updated. Much of its membership is low paid, and it is particularly strong in KwaZulu-Natal, Gauteng, Limpopo and Mpumalanga.

== Affiliates ==
=== Current affiliates ===
The NACTU has 20 affiliated unions.

Union	Abbreviation	Founded	Membership (2011)
Banking, Insurance, Finance and Allied Workers' Union	BIFAWU	2009	
Building, Construction and Allied Workers' Union	BCAWU	1975	47,000
Entertainment Catering Commercial and Allied' Workers Union Of South Africa	ECCAWUSA	1989	
Federal Council of Retail and Allied Workers	FEDCRAW	1984	4,829
HOTELICCA	HOTELICCA	1978	6,098
Industrial, Commercial and Allied Workers' Union	ICAWU		3,213
Industrial and Commercial Workers' Union of South Africa	ICU		
Inqubela Phambili Trade Union	ITU		
Labour Equity General Workers' Union of South Africa	LEWUSA	2002	
Metal and Electrical Workers' Union of South Africa	MEWUSA	1961	17,180
Media Workers' Association of South Africa	MWASA	1973	2,347
National Public Service Workers' Union	NUPSWU	1998	7,142
National Security, Commercial and General Workers' Union	NASECGWU		
National Services and Allied Workers' Union	NASAWU	1993	
National Union of Food, Beverage, Wine, Spirit and Allied Workers	NUFBWSAW	1993	10,214
Professional Educators' Union	PEU	1919	15,780
South African Chemical Workers' Union	SACWU	1980	16,055
South African Private Security Workers' Union	SAPSWU	2002	
Transport and Allied Workers' Union	TAWU	1972	13,085
Transport and Omnibus Workers' Union	TOWU	1989	2,580

=== Former affiliates ===
Union	Abbreviation	Founded	Left	Reason not affiliated	Membership (1988)
Association of Mineworkers and Construction Union	AMCU	2001	2018	Disaffiliated	N/A
Black Allied Mining and Construction Workers' Union	BAMCWU		1990	Expelled	4,119
Black Domestic Workers' Union	BDWU	1985			300
Black Electronic and Electrical Workers' Union	BEEWU		1989	Merged into MEWUSA	520
Black Trade Union of Transnet Workers	BLATU	1981	1998	Merged into SARWHU	
Black University Workers' Association	BUWA	1972	1992	Merged into MESHAWU	
Brushes and Cleaners Workers' Union	BCWU	1982	1993	Merged into NASAWU	3,000
Domestic Workers' Association of South Africa	DWASA	1974			3,000
Engineering and Allied Workers' Union of South Africa	EAWUSA	1963	1989	Merged into MEWUSA	3,000
Electrical and Allied Workers' Trade Union of South Africa	EAWTUSA	1987	1989	Merged into MEWUSA	15,000
Federated Mining Union	FMU				3,100
Federation of Municipality, Health and Allied Workers	FEDMAWU		1992	Merged into MESHAWU	
Food and Beverage Workers' Union	FBAWU	1979	1993	Merged into NUFBWSAW	17,000
Municipality, Education, State, Health And Allied Workers Union	MESHAWU	1992			N/A
Natal Liquor and Catering Workers' Union	NLCWU	1928		Transferred to FEDUSA	6,737
National Clothing and Textile Workers' Union of South Africa	NACTWUSA	2001			N/A
National Transport Movement	NTM	2012	2017	Transferred to SAFTU	N/A
National Union of Farm Workers	NUF				418
National Union of Furniture and Allied Workers	NUFAW	1956		Dissolved	20,000
National Union of Wine, Spirits and Allied Workers	NUWASW	1978	1993	Merged into NUFBWSAW	4,881
Parliamentary Staff Union	PSU				
South African Laundry, Dry Cleaning and Dyeing Workers' Union	SALDCDWU	1972	1993	Merged into NASAWU	500
South African Health and Allied Workers' Union	SAHAWU				
Steel, Engineering and Allied Workers' Union	SEAWU	1979			5,500
Textile Workers' Union	TWU	1973	1990	Expelled	400
United African Motor and Allied Workers' Union	UAMAWU	1980	1989	Merged into MEWUSA	8,000
Vukani Black Guards and Allied Workers' Union	VBGAWU	1981	1993	Merged into NASAWU	2,000

== General Secretaries ==
1986: Phiroshaw Camay
1989: Cunningham Ngcukana
2004: Mahlomola Skosana
2000s: Manene Samela
2010s to 2021: Narius Moloto

== See also ==
- Trade unions in South Africa
