= Council of Unions of South Africa =

Defunct trade union federation of South Africa

The Council of Unions of South Africa (CUSA) was a national trade union federation in South Africa.

== History ==
The federation was founded on 14 September 1980 by the former affiliates of the Black Consultative Committee which did not wish to join the Federation of South African Trade Unions, as they felt it was dominated by white activists. The new federation was more centralised than the former committee, and it was led by general secretary Phiroshaw Camay. The federation strongly opposed the apartheid system, and affiliated to both the National Forum Committee and the United Democratic Front.

The council had seven affiliates, and saw initial growth, with 49,014 members by the end of 1981. In 1982, it sought to organise mine workers, and so established the National Union of Mineworkers (NUM). All the CUSA affiliates grew, with the NUM's growth being particularly rapid. In contrast to many of its rivals, CUSA did not lay out any specific approach for affiliates to use in negotiating on pay and conditions; for example, some chose to join industrial councils, while others boycotted them. Most chose to register with the Government of South Africa, but some chose not to do so.

The NUM left in 1985, to join the Congress of South African Trade Unions (COSATU). In response, CUSA opened negotiations with the Azanian Confederation of Trade Unions (AZACTU). By 1986, CUSA had 12 affiliates with a total of 147,000 members. On 5 October, it merged with the AZACTU, to form the National Council of Trade Unions (NCTU).

== Affiliates ==
Union	Abbreviation	Founded	Left	Reason not affiliated	Membership (1981)	Membership (1986)
Brushes and Cleaners Workers' Union	BCWU	1982	1986	Transferred to NCTU	N/A	1,000
Building, Construction and Allied Workers' Union	BCAWU	1975	1986	Transferred to NCTU	9,200	27,264
Food, Beverage and Allied Workers' Union	FBAWU	1979	1986	Transferred to NCTU	6,000	16,124
Hotel, Liquor and Catering Employees' Union	HLCEU	1978	1984	Transferred to ACTU	N/A	N/A
National Union of Mineworkers	NUM	1982	1985	Transferred to COSATU	N/A	N/A
National Union of Wine and Spirits Workers	NUWSW	1978	1986	Transferred to NCTU	N/A	5,000
South African Black Municipality and Allied Workers' Union			1985	Disaffiliated	N/A	N/A
South African Chemical Workers' Union	SACWU	1973	1986	Transferred to NCTU	10,500	30,000
South African Laundry, Dry Cleaning and Dye Workers' Union	SALDCDWU	1972	1986	Transferred to NCTU	2,397	4,771
Steel, Engineering and Allied Workers' Union	SEAWU	1979	1986	Transferred to NCTU	10,734	28,927
Textile Workers' Union of the Transvaal	TWU	1973	1986	Transferred to NCTU	N/A	1,000
Transport and Allied Workers' Union	TAWU	1972	1986	Transferred to NCTU	8,183	23,327
United African Motor and Allied Workers' Union	UAMAWU	1980	1986	Transferred to NCTU	2,000	10,873
Vukani Black Guards and Allied Workers' Union	VBGAWU	1981	1986	Transferred to NCTU	N/A	514
