= Letitia Sibeko =

South African anti-apartheid activist

Letitia Sibeko (born 1930–N/A) was a South African anti-apartheid activist. She was member of the African National Congress, the ANC Women's League as well as the Federation of South African Women. She later joined the Communist Party.

== Early life ==
Lindiwe Letitia Hina, better known as 'Letitia Sibeko' was born in 1930 in Mqumba near Middledrift in the Eastern Cape. Her father, Rufus Hina was the chief of her village. She was one of 5 children. She attended a high school in her local area until the junior certificate level. She met Archie Sibeko at Fort Cox Agricultural College near Middledrift. In January 1953, they married. Both Hina and Sibeko did not believe in the principle of lobolo (brideprice) therefore she left home as Hina's parents were upset. Archie left to Cape Town soon after their marriage in pursuit of money. They planned to buy tools, livestock and start farming. Archie lived in a migrant hostel which did not allow couples. Letitia stayed with relatives in East London while he established himself. They moved in together in 1955. Archie wrote in his book Freedom in Our Lifetime, 'It must have been daunting for her, a village girl...she had to get used to living in one room which served as a bedroom, living-room and kitchen. She had to learn to cook on a primus stove, to dress as they dressed in town, to shop at the market and all the other new things.' Letitia remained religious and non-political during her time in the Eastern Cape.

Her husband, Archie Sibeko became a political activist and a trade unionist.

== Political activity ==
Her political activity started when she moved to Cape Town where she joined the African National Congress, the ANC Women's League as well as the Federation of South African Women. She participated in the Women's March in Pretoria against pass laws where she played a significant role. She was involved in the extensive planning of the demonstration, as well as the encouragement of women to sign the petition and participate in the march. She did this alongside 157 Cape Town delegates including Annie Peters, Caroline Motsoaledi, Fatima Meer, Fatima Seedat and Florence Mophosho.

In 1961 she joined the then 'underground' Communist Party. She attended the FEDSAW annual conference which took place in Cape Town where she presented a speech criticing and denouncing the Bantu education system. She was allegedly detained by the police in 1963 in order to get information on her husband, Archie Sibeko who was working 'underground' against the government. She acted a courier for him. Due to influx control regulations, Letitia was expelled from the Western Cape as her husband was no longer living there. Archie Sibeko claims that the last time he saw his wife was while he was in hiding just before he was smuggled out of South Africa. This meeting was organised by Archie's controller, Liz Abrahams, on a farm in Paarl. She was detained for months after this visit as the police were following her and were suspicious. Little is known of her activity after her expulsion. It is believed that she returned to Cape Town under a different name and managed a shabeen there. Her grandparents raised her four children in the Eastern Cape. She also had a number of other children in Cape Town. She dropped out of politics and died after falling ill. The whereabouts of her grave are unknown.

== See also ==
- Defiance Campaign
- Lobola
- Beer Hall Boycott
