= Black Trade Union of Transnet Workers =

South African trade union

The Black Trade Union of Transnet Workers (BLATU) was a Company union set up by the South African Railways and Harbours Administration in 1981. In 1982 it claimed a membership of 60,000, out of 95,000 black employees. Union dues were collected by the company, whose supervisors selected the officials. It was intended to supplant the South African Railways and Harbours Union (SARHWU).

It had a membership of 31,750 in 1990.

BLATU merged with SARHWU and the Transnet Allied Trade Union (TATU) to form the South African Transport and Allied Workers' Union (SATAWU).
