= Metal and Electrical Workers' Union of South Africa =

Engineering trade union in South Africa

The Metal and Electrical Workers' Union of South Africa (MEWUSA) is a trade union representing workers in engineering and related trades in South Africa.

The union was founded in May 1989, when the Electrical and Allied Workers' Trade Union of South Africa merged with the Electronic and Electrical Workers' Union, the Engineering and Allied Workers' Union and the United Automobile and Motor Workers' Union. Like its predecessors, it affiliated to the National Council of Trade Unions (NACTU). On formation, it had 70,000 members, making it NACTU's largest affiliate.

By 2011, the union's membership had declined to about 34,000. The union is also affiliated to the International Metalworkers' Federation.
