= Paper, Wood and Allied Workers' Union =

Former South African trade union

Logo of the union

The Paper, Wood and Allied Workers' Union (PWAWU) was a trade union representing workers in various related industries in South Africa.

The union was founded on 31 May 1974 in Springs, Transvaal, with the assistance of the Urban Training Project. It represented workers in the paper and pulp, paper printing and packaging, wood, sawmills and furniture industries. Although it initially had only 100 members, it grew steadily. It joined the Consultative Committee, but resigned in 1978. In 1979, it was a founding affiliate of the Federation of South African Trade Unions, and by 1981 it had 8,300 members.

The union was a founding affiliate of the Congress of South African Trade Unions in 1985. In October 1987, the union absorbed the small Printing and Allied Workers' Union, and was renamed as the Paper, Printing, Wood and Allied Workers' Union (PPWAWU). By 1993, it had about 30,000 members. In 1999, it merged with the Chemical Workers' Industrial Union, to form the Chemical, Energy, Paper, Printing, Wood and Allied Workers' Union.

== General Secretaries ==
- 1974: Benjy Mngoma
- 1970s: P. Malaza
- 1980s: Refiloe Ndzutha
- 1987: Jeremy Baskin
- 1980s: Sipho Kubheka
- 1990s: Bengeza Mthombeni
