= Chemical Workers' Industrial Union =

Trade union in South Africa

Logo of the union

The Chemical Workers' Industrial Union (CWIU) was a trade union representing workers in chemical and related industries in South Africa.

== History ==
The union was founded on 24 November 1974, on the initiative of the General Factory Workers' Benefit Fund. By the end of the year, it had about 1,000 members and had affiliated to the Trade Union Advisory and Co-ordinating Council. It developed a strategy of focusing on building the organisation in a small number of factories, mostly Revertex and Henkel. It declined to only 500 members in 1979, but that year became a founding affiliate of the Federation of South African Trade Unions. It expanded into the Transvaal in 1980, and by 1981 had grown to 4,200 members.

The union absorbed the Glass and Allied Workers' Union in December 1982. It was a founding affiliate of the Congress of South African Trade Unions in 1985, and by 1986 had grown further, to 29,859 members. In 1999, it merged with the Paper, Printing and Allied Workers' Union, to form the Chemical, Energy, Paper, Printing, Wood and Allied Workers' Union.

== General Secretaries ==
1974-75: Omar Badsha
1975-1981?: Nombuso Dlamini
1981? to 1994: Rod Crompton
1994: Muzi Buthelezi
