= City Deep, Gauteng =

City Deep
- Location within Gauteng Location within South Africa
- Coordinates: 26.2282°S 28.0812°E
- Country: South Africa
- Province: Gauteng
- Municipality: City of Johannesburg
- Main Place: Johannesburg

Area
  - Total: 8.77 km^{2} (3.39 sq mi)

Population (2011)
  - Total: 1,338
  - Density: 153/km^{2} (395/sq mi)

Racial makeup (2011)
  - Black African: 99.9%
  - Indian/Asian: 0.1%

First languages (2011)
  - Xhosa: 29.1%
  - Northern Sotho: 27.1%
  - Zulu: 16.2%
  - Venda: 8.9%
  - Other: 18.8%
- Time zone: UTC+2 (SAST)
- Postal code (street): 2197
- PO box: 2049

City Deep is an industrial suburb of Johannesburg, South Africa. It is located in Region F of the City of Johannesburg Metropolitan Municipality. Locally is a large container terminal of Transnet Freight Rail in operation, the most significant dry port of the country, and the Joburg Market (formerly named as Johannesburg Fresh Produce Market).

== History ==
=== Container terminal ===
City Deep Terminal is the name of Africa's largest Dry Port and was officially opened by the South African Railways Services (SARS) in 1977. The container terminal is connected to the Port of Durban, Port of Ngqurha, Port of Cape Town, as well as Southern Africa by road and rail. At least forty percent of container export/imports run on the Natal Corridor (Natcor) which is directly linked by rail to City Deep. The Natal Corridor traverses through an estimated distance of 714 kilometres (444 miles) by rail between Johannesburg and Durban. The main equipment used for its operations include Rail Mounted Gantry Cranes [RMG], Reach Stackers, Empty Container Handlers and Terminal Tractors or Haulers. The Terminal covers a 117ha area and has just over 3,000 Terminal Ground Slots (TGS), of which less than 100 are for Refrigerated containers. The throughput capacity of the port is estimated at a minimum of 400,000 TEU per annum.

=== Market ===
Joburg Market (formerly called the Johannesburg Fresh Produce Market) is also situated at City Deep and was opened in September 1974. It is a 65,000-square-metre (700,000-square-foot) facility, the largest market supplier of fruit and vegetables in South Africa and Africa with 45,000 buyers visiting each day.

The original markets, in its various forms, began at Market Square, Johannesburg in 1886 and moved to Newtown in 1913. The Johannesburg Town Council took over full control in 1906 when they bought the Transvaal government's share. In 1946, the City of Johannesburg began to investigate a new location. In 1963, the city finalised the location at City Deep. Construction began on 15 January 1968 and was completed at a cost of R18 million, opening on 3 September 1974 by the minister of agriculture.

At the time of its opening, the market consisted of eight 304m by 24m sale halls and one 457m by 30m sale hall. Accommodation for market officials and users, 37 refrigeration and ripening rooms, banks, post office, restaurant and cafeterias. Annual turnover at its opening in 1974 consisted of R42 million in sales, accounting for 26% of the country's fresh produce sales.
