= Elizabeth Mafekeng =

South African trade union leader (1918–2009)

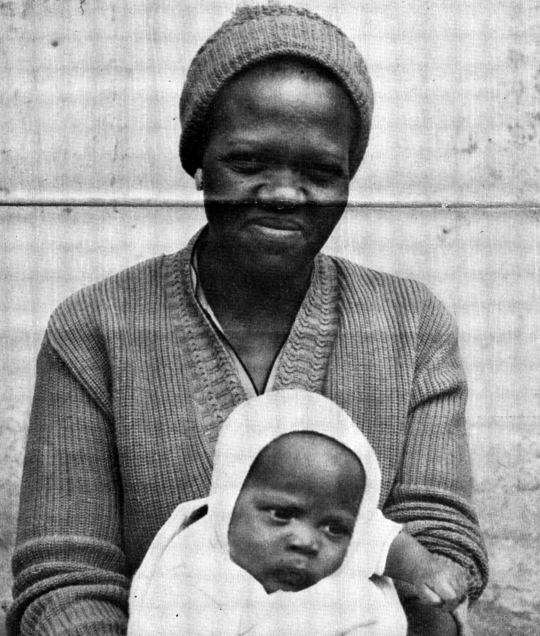
- Born: 18 September 1918; Tarkastad, Union of South Africa
- Died: 28 May 2009 (aged 90); Paarl, Western Cape, South Africa
- Occupations: trade union leader and anti apartheid activist

Elizabeth Mafekeng (18 September 1918 – 28 May 2009) was a South African trade union leader and anti apartheid activist. She was the first African woman to be banned by the government.

== Biography ==
Mafekeng was born in Tarkastad, a small town located between Queenstown and Cradock, Eastern Capeon 18 September 1918. Her father, Andries, died in the same year. She was the youngest of five children and when her father died, the family left Tarkastad and her mother Kathrine went to work in Kimberley to bring up her family. Mafekeng's family then settled in Aliwal North, while Elizabeth remained with her Grandmother, Marther Mafekeng, who raised her.

Mafekeng's family left Aliwal North, Eastern Cape for Huguenot in the Western Cape, where she attended a school for Coloured children as there were no schools for African children. When she reached standard 2, she was transferred to an African school in Cape Town where she started until she reached Standard 7. At 14, due to her impoverished background, Mafekeng had to leave school and go to work to support her family.

In 1932, Mafekeng was employed at the H Jones and Co, a canning factory in Paarl where she cleaned basins of fruit for 75c a weekend. She endured long working hours and poor working conditions. In 1938, Elizabeth married a fellow factory worker Henry Moffat Mdityana. The couple lived with their eleven children, three sons and eight daughters, in a cottage on Barbarossa Street, Paarl until she was banished in 1959.

== Political life ==
Mafekeng's political career began in 1941, when the Communist Party of South Africa (CPSA) helped organise the Food and Canning Workers Union and improved working conditions. Twenty-three-year-old Mafekeng joined both organisations as a shop steward and a committee member. She remained part of FCWU until 1947, when apartheid legislation forced the union to split into two racially separate unions, the FCWU and the African Food and Canning Workers’ Union (AFCWU). The South African apartheid government passed the Suppression of Communism Act which banned CPSA in 1950. In 1952 Mafekeng participated in the African National Congress (ANC) led Defiance Campaign.

In January 1954, Mafekeng led an African Food and Canning Workers’ Union (AFCWU) strike in Wolseley for higher wages and better working conditions. There were constant strikes in the fishing hamlets and Namaqualand, namely Lambert's Bay Worcester, Montague, Daljosaphat, Paarl and Wellington. Later that year, she was elected as the president of AFCWU and sent as a delegate at the founding conference of the Federation of South African Women in Johannesburg. Mafekeng also became the secretary of the Food Workers Union in the same year.

In 1955, Mafekeng was the representative of the South African Food Workers by the Food and Canning Workers’ Union in a Congress of the Food and Canning Workers organised by the Tobacco Hotel Industries in Sofia. Mafekeng secretly left South Africa "disguised as a servant," with no passport. In Sofia, she said that she "tasted for the first time real human treatment with no discrimination whatsoever." On her return to South Africa, she faced police brutality and questioning about her business in Sofia. She is said to have greatly impressed the gathering, and was elected to the presidium of the conference. She also travelled to Britain, Sweden and China.

"Rocky" as Mafekeng was known in the trade unionist circles, took part in the £1-A-Day campaign organised by the South African Congress of Trade Unions, joined the Paarl branch of the ANC Women's League and was elected as its Vice President in 1957.

== Banishment ==
On 11 November 1959, the apartheid regime served Mafekeng with a deportation (banning) order shortly after she had led a demonstration in Paarl against an attempt to issue passes to African women. Mafekeng, who was the first African woman to be banned, was banished to Southey near Vryburg in the Northern Cape. She fled to Lesotho where she endured harsh conditions as well as being away from her children and husband.

In 1990, Mafekeng returned to South Africa where she continued her involvement in the trade union movement until her retirement due to ill-health. A home was built for her by the Food and Canning Workers Union (FCWU) in Mbekweni Township in Paarl. She died on May 28, 2009.

== Legacy ==
Mafekeng was awarded with Meritorious Service Posthumously.

== See also ==
- List of people subject to banning orders under apartheid
