= South African Commercial, Catering and Allied Workers Union =

Trade union in South Africa

SACCAWU
- South African Commercial, Catering and Allied Workers Union
- Founded: 1975
- Headquarters: Johannesburg, South Africa
- Location: South Africa
- Members: 107,000
- Key people: Patrick Hailane, President; Mduduzi Mbongwe, General Secretary
- Affiliations: COSATU

The South African Commercial, Catering and Allied Workers Union (SACCAWU) is a trade union representing retail, distribution, and hospitality workers in South Africa.

== History ==
The union was founded in 1975, as the Commercial Catering and Allied Workers' Union (CCAWUSA). The first General Secretary was the union stalwart, Emma Mashinini, and Makhulu Ledwaba was elected as the first President of CCAWUSA. It initially grew strongly, but an unsuccessful strike in 1984 for higher wages in large hotels led to most of the hospitality workers leaving, while the small Federal Council of Retail and Allied Workers also split away.

In, 1985 it was a founding affiliate of the Congress of South African Trade Unions (COSATU). Both Mashinini and Ledwaba played an instrumental role in the establishment of COSATU, with Ledwaba elected as 2nd Vice-President of COSATU.

COSATU called for "One Industry One Union" and CCAWUSA began merger negotiations with the Hotel and Restaurant Workers' Union (HARWU). CCAWUSA became divided on ideological lines, one group close to the African National Congress, but in 1990, COSATU negotiated a truce, with HARWU also merging in. The union renamed itself as the "South African Commercial, Catering and Allied Workers' Union".

SACCAWU is an affiliate of COSATU as well as an affiliate of two International Unions, UNI-Global Unions where the General Secretary Bones Skulu serve on the executive as well as serving as President of UN- Africa, and Union of Food, Agricultural, Hotel, Restaurant, Catering, Tobacco International Network (UIF).

SACCAWU has eight regions; Eastern Cape, Free State/Northern Cape, Mpumalanga, Northern, North West-Vaal, Western Cape, and Witwatersrand regions.

== General Secretaries ==
1975: Emma Mashinini
1986: Vivian Mtwa
1991: Papi Kganare
1995: Bones Skulu
2023: Mduduzi Mbongwe

== Presidents ==
1975: Makhulu Ledwaba
1988: Duma Nkosi
1990s: Amos Mothapo
2013: Louise Thipe
2023: Patrick Hailane
