= 1956 Treason Trial =

1956 trial in South Africa

The Treason Trial was a trial in Johannesburg in which 156 people, including Nelson Mandela, were arrested in a raid and accused of treason in South Africa in 1956.

The main trial lasted until 1961, when all of the defendants were found not guilty. During the trials, Oliver Tambo left the country and was exiled. Whilst in other European and African countries, he started an organisation which helped bring publicity to the African National Congress's cause in South Africa. Some of the defendants were later convicted in the Rivonia Trial in 1964.

Chief Luthuli has said of the Treason Trial:

The treason trial must occupy a special place in South African history. That grim pre-dawn raid, deliberately calculated to strike terror into hesitant minds and impress upon the entire nation the determination of the governing clique to stifle all opposition, made one hundred and fifty-six of us, belonging to all the races of our land, into a group of accused facing one of the most serious charges in any legal system.

== Background ==
On 5 December 1956, the South African Police's Security Branch raided and arrested 140 people from around the country on the charge of treason as they enforced the Suppression of Communism Act. Those not based in Johannesburg were flown there in military aircraft and held in custody until a hearing on 19 December 1956. The raids were follow-ups to those conducted in 1955 and included search warrants to look for documents at 48 anti-government organisations.

On 19 December 1956, 153 prisoners were driven to the Johannesburg Drill Hall for a preliminary hearing to examine the state's evidence. Magistrate Frederick Wessels was the presiding judge with J.C. van Niekerk as the state's public prosecutor. An attempt by the prosecutor to proceed with the case was interrupted three times as the noise of 5,000 black South Africans, hoping to attend the case, surrounded the streets of the Drill Hall and sang "Nkosi Sikeleli Afrika". The proceedings had to be halted. The Labour Party in the UK accused the South African Government of intimidating and victimising those opposed to Apartheid, condemning the trial and called South Africa a police state.

Resuming on 20 December 1956, the hearing was interrupted again when the defence objected to their clients being behind a six-foot-high (1.8 m) wire fence. After an adjournment, it was agreed by the two sides to reduce it to a barrier four foot (1.2 m) tall. The prosecutor J.C. van Niekerk then presented an outline of his evidence stretching back to 1953 of the liberation movement's activities but his evidence was soon interrupted when violence broke out outside the court. After police began moving back the crowd of around a 1,000 black protesters, a policeman was injured by a stone and they retaliated by firing into the crowd and surrounding cars and shops, injuring fourteen people. Deputy Police Commissioner Colonel Piet Grobler was able to get his men to stop shooting and order was restored.

The trial examination would continue on 21 December 1956 and the prosecutor presented his case by stating that the defendants were subversive, having attended the recent Congress of the People gathering at Kliptown where speeches had promoted Communism, the creation of the Freedom Charter, the need to seek help abroad and in other evidence, and the need to raise money to buy firearms. With no charges yet presented to the individual detainees, bail was granted and the trial was concluded until 9 January 1957. Rioting broke out at the end of the day's proceedings when police charged a group of 400 black South African protesters.

On resumption of the preliminary hearing and an examination of the state's evidence on 9 January 1957, three more defendants were added to the charges bringing the number to 156 persons. The defence would argue that the Freedom Charter was not treasonous, that it did not call for violence, and it argued for peace and racial harmony for the country.

The hearing was still ongoing during August 1957, where the accused were spending six hours each day in court. With the hearing to last a few more months, the magistrate had more 6,200 pages of testimony and 10,000 exhibits to examine and decide whether to pass the sentences himself or let the Attorney General decide whether to proceed to a trial. The trial was taking so long, the male prisoners formed a choir.

On 17 December 1957, Attorney General W.J. McKenzie decided to drop charges against 61 and proceed to trial with the remaining 95 defendants on 13 January 1958. Albert Luthuli and 44 black, six white, four Indian, and six coloured defendants were released.

The hearing resumed on 13 January 1958 with the prosecutor informing the court of the names of those 61 defendants who had been cleared of further charges.

The hearing concluded on 30 January 1958 with Magistrate F.C. Wessels finding that there was sufficient evidence for the defendants to be tried on charges of high treason. The defendants were asked to plead, with all pleading not guilty they were released on bail. Their defence lawyers asked for a jury trial, the alternative being a trial by two or three judges, a request rejected by the state in treason trials.

The Treason Trial began in Pretoria on 1 August 1958 with 91 people on trial having been charged with high treason. The trial saw 57 blacks, 16 whites, 16 Indians, and two coloureds charged with attempting to overthrow the South African government between 1952 and 1956 with the intention to replace it with a communist system. The defence lawyers opened the trial by lodging an objection to two of the three trial judges. They called for Justice Joseph Ludorf to withdraw because of his involvement as a lawyer in other cases against some defendants while Justice Frans Rumpff should withdraw as he had asked for the former to be appointed as a judge on the treason trial. The case was then adjourned until the following Monday.

When the trial resumed on 12 August 1958, chief defence lawyer Israel A. Maisels continued to challenge the indictment referring to the masses of documentary evidence which he claimed was impossible to read in less than two years, and was an abuse of the court process and that the prosecution did not know what its case was about.

After the trial collapsed in October, it was decided in November 1958 to resume the trial on 19 January 1959 with a decision to drop 60 people from the indictment.

On 22 November 1958, 30 of the 91 were re-indicted with the charge now having been narrowed down to a conspiracy to endanger and overthrow the state based on the 1955 Congress of the People gathering and the adoption of the Freedom Charter. The remaining 61 were to be indicted in April 1959.

The trial resumed on 19 January 1959 in Pretoria with the defence arguing for the trial to be moved back to Johannesburg, due to the hardship of travel for the defendants, a city where the majority of them lived. The case was postponed on the first day until after lunch as the bus carrying the defendants had broken down. The trial resumed on 2 February 1959, with the venue change request squashed and the defence lawyers continuing their argument against the new indictments.

With the resumption of the trial on 20 April 1959 of the other 61 defendants, it was ended when Judge Rumpff declared that the Crown's case could not accuse the defendants of conspiracy without saying how they entered into the conspiracy and that they would need to know in order to defend their case. The defendants could return home and the prosecution would have to decide whether to re-indict them.

On 29 March 1961, down to 28 defendants, the trial's verdict was released and they were all found not guilty of treason and discharged. Judge Rumpff concluded that the prosecution could not show that the African National Congress (ANC) had become a communist organisation and therefore no treason could be proven nor that any act of violence was to be used to overthrow the state. The defendants were met outside the court by their relatives and saw the singing of Nkosi Sikeleli Afrika.

== Defendants ==
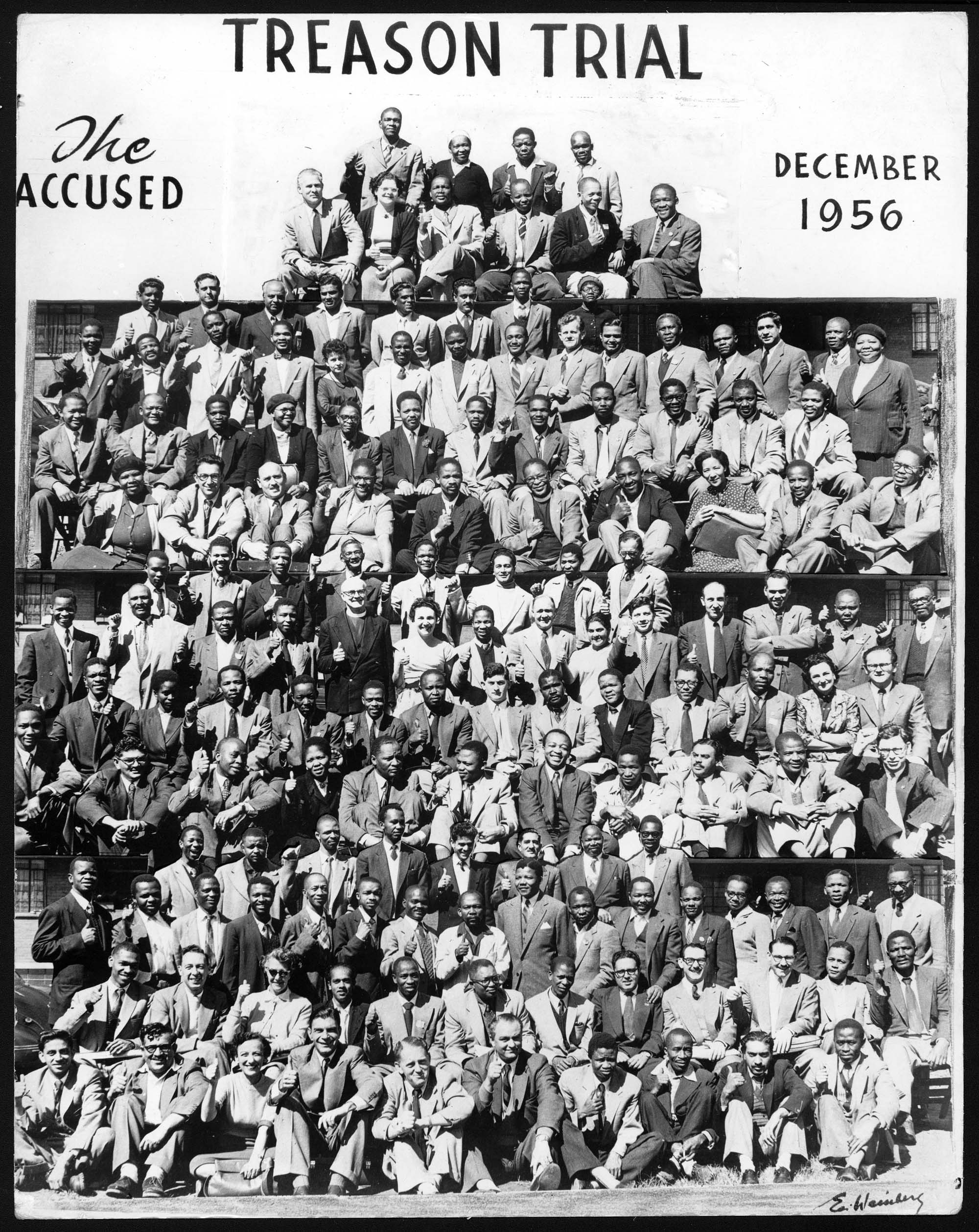
Group photo of the defendants of the trial

In December 1956, many key members of the Congress Alliance were arrested and charged with treason, including almost the entire executive committee of the ANC, as well as the SACP, the SAIC, and the COD. 105 Africans, 21 Indians, 23 whites and 7 coloured leaders were arrested. Ten were women. Many arrestees, including Nelson Mandela, were detained in communal cells in Johannesburg Prison on Constitutional Hill, known as the Fort, resulting in what Mandela described as "the largest and longest unbanned meeting of the Congress Alliance in years." However, white men, white women, black men and black women were all held in a separate parts of the jail.

Initially, 156 defendants were charged with high treason. The number of defendants was later reduced to 92. In November 1957, the prosecution reworded the indictment and proceeded a separate trial against 30 accused. Their trial commenced in August 1959. The remaining 61 accused were tried separately before the case against them was dismissed in mid 1960.

=== Treason trial defendants (during various stages of the trial) included ===
- Farid Adams (one of the final 30 defendants)
- Jacqueline (Jackie) Arenstein
- Lionel Bernstein, known as Rusty, Congress of the People and Congress of Democrats
- Piet Beyleveld
- Sonia Bunting, communist organizer for SACP and journalist (released in October 1958 after her acquittal)
- Rev. James Calata
- Yusuf Dadoo, leader of the South African Indian Congress
- Ruth First, SACP, journalist and wife of Joe Slovo
- Lionel Forman, lawyer and journalist (indictment withdrawn), died in 1959.
- Archie Gumede, ANC, later leader of the United Democratic Front.
- Bertha Gxowa (one of the final 30 defendants)
- Alfred Hutchinson (a coloured journalist who fled South Africa before the conclusion of the trial)
- Helen Joseph, white trade unionist and women's leader (one of the final 30 defendants)
- Ahmed Kathrada, accused number three, secretary-general of the Transvaal Indian Youth Congress (one of the final 30 defendants)
- Fish Keitseng
- Moses Kotane, ANC delegate to the Asian-African Conference in Bandung
- Alex La Guma, journalist and writer
- Arthur Letele, treasurer-general of ANC and medical doctor
- Leon Levy (one of the final 30 defendants)
- Stanley Lollan, accused number four, South African Coloured People's Organisation (one of the final 30 defendants)
- Chief Luthuli, known as Chief Luthuli, then-president of the ANC, later released for lack of evidence.
- Nelson Mandela, ANC (one of the final 30 defendants)
- Z. K. Mathews, academic
- Vuyisile Mini, Trade Union leader and musician
- Wilton Mkwayi, went into hiding during the 1960 State of Emergency while the other defendants were detained, later arrested and tried during the Rivonia Trial.
- Ida Fiyo Mntwana, first national president of the Federation of South African Women, died March 1960 before verdict (one of the final 30 defendants)
- Joe Modise (ANCYL Leader, then a working class township youth working as a bus driver)
- Rev. Douglas Thompson
- Patrick Molaoa, ANC youth league
- Narainsamy Thumbi "NT" Naicker, Former Secretary-General of the Natal Indian Congress (founded by Mahatma Gandhi in 1894), Former Secretary-General of the South African Indian Congress and one of the original drafters of the Freedom Charter.
- Elias Moretsele, ANC leader, died a few weeks before the trial ended (one of the final 30 defendants)
- Lionel Morrison, youngest defendant at 21 years of age. Stowed away to the UK and claimed asylum, becoming a UK citizen, died in 2016.
- Motsamai Mpho
- Monty Naicker, the Gandhian leader of the Natal Indian Congress
- Marimuthu Pragalathan Naicker, trade union leader, journalist, vice president of the Natal Indian Congress
- Billy Nair, trade unionist in Natal
- Lillian Ngoyi (one of the final 30 defendants)
- Duma Nokwe (one of the final 30 defendants)
- Peter Nthite, ANC Youth League
- George Peake
- Nimrod Sejake
- Archie Sibeko, also known as Zola Zembe, later released and sent into permanent exile
- Reggie September
- Gert Sibande
- Debi Singh, SAIC
- Walter Sisulu, ANC (one of the final 30 defendants)
- Joe Slovo, SACP lawyer (one of the final 30 defendants)
- Oliver Tambo, released for lack of evidence, goes into exile to co-ordinate the ANC from abroad.
- Ben Turok, academic, was a member of the South African Parliament, retired c 2014
- M.B. Yengwa, Natal ANC

=== Lawyers for the defense ===
The lawyers for the defense included:

- Israel Maisels, known as Issy Maisels, leader of the defence team, with:
- Vernon Berrangé
- Bram Fischer
- Maurice Franks
- Harold Hanson
- Ruth Hayman
- Sydney Kentridge
- Shulamith Muller
- G. Nicholas
- Norman Rosenberg
- Rex Welsh

Furthermore,

- Nelson Mandela and Duma Nokwe conducted the defence during the state of the emergency after the Sharpeville Massacre, when the trialists instructed their defence lawyers to temporarily withdraw from the case.
- Joe Slovo conducted his own defence.

== Other notable figures involved in the treason trial ==
Prosecutors included:

- J.C. Van Niekerk, chief prosecutor
- Oswald Pirow (from January 1958 onwards)
- Jacob de Vos, who replaced Pirow after his death in 1959

Judges included:

- Justice F.L. Rumpff, president, who was also a judge at the 1952 Defiance Trial
- Justice Kennedy
- Justice Joseph Ludorf, who withdrew when the defence argued he had a conflict of interest
- Justice Simon Becker

Witnesses included:

- Professor Andrew Howson Murray, Department of Philosophy, University of Cape Town, brought in by the prosecution as an expert on communism.

== Defence and Aid Fund ==
After the British priest, Canon John Collins learnt about the trial, and the calls for the death penalty, he set up the Defence and Aid Fund for Southern Africa to pay all legal expenses and look after the families of those on trial. This was one of the first examples of foreign intervention against apartheid in South Africa and proved very successful with over £75,000 being raised towards defending those accused. Harry Oppenheimer allegedly contributed £40,000 to the fund.

In 1957, the campaigner Mary Benson joined the Defence Fund as its secretary.

== Significance of the trial ==
In many ways, the trial and prolonged periods in detention strengthened and solidified the relationships between members of the multi-racial Congress Alliance. Rusty Bernstein wrote:

Inter-racial trust and co-operation is a difficult plant to cultivate in the poisoned soil outside. It is somewhat easier in here where ... the leaders of all ethnic factions of the movement are together and explore each other's doubts and reservations, and speak about them without constraint. Coexistence in the Drill Hall deepens and recreates their relationships.

The trial and resulting periods of detention also allowed ANC leaders to consult about the direction of their struggle and the possibility of armed struggle. Ironically, the court found that the ANC was nonviolent just as the ANC was starting to question the effectiveness of this strategy. In court, the 156 defendants sat in alphabetical order, visibly displaying the multiracial nature of the anti-apartheid movement. While the defendants sat side by side in court, they were strictly segregated in jail. When the trialists took over their own defence during the State of Emergency, they eventually convinced prison authorities to let them meet to plan their defence and white female defendants, white male defendants and black women defendants were brought to the African men's prison. Yet the prison authorities still sought to physically separate these defendants by race and gender in their meeting space. Mandela describes the practical dilemma the proponents of apartheid faced:

The authorities erected an iron grille to separate Helen and Leon [Levy] (as whites) from us and a second partition to separate them from Lilian and Bertha [Mashaba Gxowa] (as African women) ... Even a master architect would have had trouble designing such a structure.

== Trial timeline ==
- December 1956: 156 anti-apartheid leaders arrested
- December 1956 – January 1958: Preparatory examination in a magistrate's court to determine if there was sufficient evidence to warrant a trial.
- November 1957: Prosecution rewords the indictment and proceeded a separate trial against 30 accused. The remaining 61 accused were to be tried separately before the case against them was dismissed in mid 1959.
- August 1959: Trial against 30 defendants proceeds in the Supreme Court.
- 5 March 1960: Chief Luthuli's testimony begins.
- 8 April 1960: ANC is declared banned in the wake of the State of Emergency declared after the Sharpeville massacre. Defendants retained in custody for five months and trial resumes without lawyers for several months.
- May 1960: Helen Joseph and 21 left-wing white women detained during the State of Emergence embark on an eight-day hunger strike. The children of detainees protest outside Johannesburg City Hall.
- 3 August 1960: Mandela's testimony begins.
- 7 October 1960: Defense closes.
- 23 March 1961: Trial adjourned for a week.
- 29 March 1961: Accused are found not guilty.

== See also ==
- Little Rivonia Trial
- Upington 26
