= The World That Was Ours =

The World that was Ours
- Persephone Books edition cover, 2009
- Author: Hilda Bernstein
- Cover artist: Walter Battiss
- Language: English
- Genre: Political Memoir
- Publisher: Persephone Books
- Publication date: First Published in 1967 by Heinemann
- Publication place: South Africa
- Media type: Print (Softback)
- ISBN: 978-1-906462-09-3
- OCLC: 261175872

The World that was Ours (1967) is Hilda Bernstein's personal account of life in Johannesburg under the oppressive surveillance of the apartheid regime. Hilda and her husband Rusty Bernstein were both detained, along with many others, in the aftermath of the Sharpeville massacre of 1960. Upon their release, Rusty was placed under house arrest, while Hilda's day-to-day activities were closely monitored by the Special Branch, if not altogether prohibited. Her memoir recalls these fraught years in the build-up to the landmark Rivonia Trial, the events and ordeals of the Trial itself, and finally the couple's reluctant decision to flee their beloved country in the wake of Rusty's acquittal.

While on the one hand The World that was Ours offers vivid historical insight into the tumultuous climate of Johannesburg in the early 1960s, on the other it reads as a poignant and emotional recollection of the narrator's personal dilemmas, as a mother, a wife and a political activist, torn between her private and public responsibilities. 'This has survived as a South African classic,' wrote Anthony Sampson in the Spectator, 'not just because it's beautifully written, but because it conveys the combination of ordinariness and danger which is implicit in any totalitarian state.'

The World that was Ours is dedicated to 'the men of Rivonia' - Nelson Mandela, Walter Sisulu, Ahmed Kathrada, Denis Goldberg, Govan Mbeki, Elias Motsoaledi, Andrew Mlangeni and Rusty Bernstein - as well as to their devoted counsel, Bram Fischer.
