= Ben Turok =

South African activist and politician (1927–2019)

Chairperson of the Joint Committee on Ethics and Members' Interest
- In office 8 February 2011 – 6 May 2014 Serving with Buoang Mashile
- Preceded by: Luwellyn Landers
- Succeeded by: Amos Masondo

Member of the National Assembly
- In office 1994 – 6 May 2014

Personal details
- Born: Benjamin Turok; 26 June 1927 Socialist Soviet Republic of Byelorussia
- Died: 9 December 2019 (aged 92) Cape Town, South Africa
- Citizenship: South Africa
- Party: African National Congress
- Other political affiliations: Congress of Democrats; South African Communist Party
- Spouse: Mary Turok
- Children: 3, including Neil Turok

Benjamin Turok (26 June 1927 – 9 December 2019) was a South African anti-apartheid activist, politician, and economics professor. He represented the African National Congress in the post-apartheid National Assembly from 1994 to 2014.

== Early life and activism ==
Turok was born to poor working-class Jewish parents in Byelorussia in 1927, who were radicalized by the secular Jewish socialist Bundist movement; his parents migrated to Libau, Latvia when his father became involved in the Jewish labor movement. Later, seeking safety, Turok's father moved the family to the then Union of South Africa in 1934. Jewish identification in his household was mostly cultural and his parents were involved in Yiddish theatre: "There were play readings, poetry evenings, political debates and a host of similar events all focusing on the Jewish way of life". His parents were not religious and he did not have a bar mitzvah, however he was obliged to attend Hebrew school.

Turok graduated from the University of Cape Town in 1950. Returning to South Africa in 1953, he joined the South African Congress of Democrats and in 1955 became its secretary for the Cape Western region, acting as a full-time organiser for the Congress of the People. With Billy Nair, he drafted the economics section of the Freedom Charter. He was also the African representative on the Cape Provincial Council and served time in police detention, including as a defendant in the 1956 Treason Trial.

== Personal life and death ==
Turok married Mary Butcher, a politician and activist. They had three sons together: Fred Turok; Ivan Turok; and Neil Turok, a cosmologist and founder of the African Institute for Mathematical Sciences in Muizenberg, South Africa.

He died on the morning of 9 December 2019 at his home in Cape Town. He was 92 years old.
