= Congress of the People =

Congress of the People may refer to:

- Congress of the People (1955), a political summit in South Africa
- Congress of the People (South African political party)
- Congress of the People (Trinidad and Tobago), a political party

== See also ==
- Congress of People, a political party in India
