= Mary Turok =

South African politician and activist

Member of the National Assembly
- In office May 1994 – June 1999

Personal details
- Born: Mary Elizabeth Butcher
- Citizenship: South Africa
- Party: African National Congress
- Other political affiliations: South African Communist Party; Congress of Democrats
- Spouse: Ben Turok (died 2019)
- Children: 3, including Neil Turok
- Education: University of Cape Town

Mary Elizabeth Turok (née Butcher) is a retired South African politician and former anti-apartheid activist who represented the African National Congress (ANC) in the National Assembly from 1994 to 1999. A veteran of the South African Communist Party (SACP) and Congress of Democrats, she lived in exile from 1964 to 1990 after her husband, Ben Turok, was imprisoned for his activism.

== Early life and activism ==
Turok attended the University of Cape Town, where she became involved in progressive politics and met Ben Turok, the man she married; she succeeded him as the secretary of Cape Town's Modern Youth Society. She was among the first white activists to join the ANC's 1952 Defiance Campaign, although membership of the ANC itself was at that time limited to black Africans.

She was a founding member of the Congress of Democrats (COD) and was COD's delegate to the All-African Peoples' Conference, and she also joined the SACP, at that time banned by the apartheid government. She was detained for six months for aiding the illegal ANC. Albie Sachs, who was her political colleague at the time, later said that she was both "warm and formidable".

In 1965, Turok's husband was released on house arrest after serving a three-year sentence for his activities with Umkhonto we Sizwe, and the couple fled South Africa with their children to evade further police attention. They remained in exile, primarily in Britain, for the next 24 years.

Turok and her family returned to South Africa in early February 1990, shortly after President F. W. de Klerk announced that his government would unban the ANC and SACP to facilitate negotiations to end apartheid. She joined the ANC structures that were being re-established inside the country after the party's return to exile, and she publicly advocated for women to participate in the ongoing democratic transition, writing in the Star in 1992:

Nowhere in the world have women been handed equality on a plate; everywhere they have had to fight for it. South Africa will be no exception. We do not want our daughters to turn on us in the years to come and ask: 'Where were you when the Bill of Rights and the new Constitution were being drafted?'

== Legislative career ==
In the 1994 general election, South Africa's first under universal suffrage, Turok was elected to an ANC seat in the National Assembly, the new lower house of the South African Parliament. Her husband joined her in another ANC seat in 1995; in 1998, the parliamentary register of members' interests recording that they were the richest members of Parliament, sharing R1.5 million in shareholdings. Turok served a single term in her seat and left after the 1999 general election.

== Retirement and personal life ==
Turok had three children – Neil, Fred, and Ivan – with her husband Ben, who died in December 2019. After retiring from frontline politics, the couple retired to the coastal suburbs of Cape Town, and Turok was an active member of the Muizenberg Tenants' Association and later of the Noordhoek Ratepayers' Association.
