= R v Zikalala =

South African legal case

- Court: Appellate Division
- Full case name: Rex v Zikalala
- Decided: 6 March 1953
- Citation: 1953 (2) SA 568 (A)

Court membership
- Judges sitting: Centlivres CJ, Schreiner JA and Van den Heever JA

Case opinions
- Decision by: Van den Heever JA

Keywords
- Criminal procedure, Appeal, Conviction, Culpable homicide, Reasonable doubt, Self defence

Rex v Zikalala is an important case in South African criminal law, heard on February 27, 1953. Zikalala, the appellant, had been charged and convicted of the culpable homicide in causing the death of one Alpheus Tsele. On appeal to the Appellate Division, he successfully argued self-defence.

== Facts ==
Zikalala had been convicted of culpable homicide on a charge of murder. It appeared, however, that the trial court had found that the evidence for the defence might reasonably be substantially true.

== Judgment ==
The Appellate Division set the conviction. The trial court, it held, should have had, on the basis of finding that the evidence for the defence might reasonably be substantially true, and in the light of the circumstances and considerations reflected in the evidence, a reasonable doubt as to whether the Crown had established that the appellant had not killed the deceased lawfully in private-defence.

The court endorsed the following propositions from Gardiner and Lansdown, based on authority:

Where a man can save himself by flight, he should flee rather than kill his assailant [...]. But no one can be expected to take to flight to avoid an attack, if flight does not afford him a safe way of escape. A man is not bound to expose himself to the risk of a stab in the back, when by killing his assailant he can secure his own safety [...]. In considering the question of self-defence, a jury must endeavour to imagine itself in the position in which the accused was.

For the court a quo, it was "difficult to understand why the accused didn't cry out for help and why the other people there did not overpower the deceased." This observation, held Van den Heever JA for the Appellate Division, was

based on general knowledge of human reactions and not on the evidence. One knows from experience in trial cases that natives are apt to take up the attitude "that is their business", and that the principal actors in such a scene are apt to resent the interference of outsiders. In any event, nobody is ambitious to overpower an aggressor armed with a lethal weapon.

The court a quo also said it had "great difficulty in this case in holding that the accused could not get away and that he did not have a reasonable chance to get away if he wanted to." Van den Heever JA, responding to this, noted that the hall in which the murder had occurred

was packed and that movement therein was difficult. But the observation places a risk upon the appellant that he was not obliged to bear. He was not called upon to stake his life upon "a reasonable chance to get away". If he had done so he may well have figured as the deceased at the trial, instead of as the accused person. Moreover, one must not impute to a person who suddenly becomes the object of a murderous attack that mental calm and ability to reason out ex post facto ways of avoiding the assault without having recourse to violence.

== See also ==
- South African criminal law
- Self-defence
