= Israel A. Maisels =

South African lawyer and judge (1905–1994)

Israel Aaron Maisels QC
- Born: 19 November 1905; Johannesburg, Transvaal Colony
- Died: 8 December 1994 (aged 89)
- Education: University of the Witwatersrand
- Occupations: Barrister, judge and Community leader
- Years active: 1928 – 1992
- Known for: Apartheid era political and civil rights trials
- Spouse(s): Muriel Maisels (nee Freed, m. 1934)
- Children: 4

Israel Aaron “Isie” Maisels (19 November 1905 – 8 December 1994) was a judge of the High Court of Southern Rhodesia and the Judge President of Botswana, Lesotho and Swaziland. He practised law in South Africa from 1928 until his retirement in 1992 and was widely regarded as “pre-eminent among his generation of advocates” and “one of the country’s most formidable legal minds.” In addition to a legal practice, he is best known for his defence of those prosecuted for their political beliefs and “as a man whose life and interests reflected a deep concern for human rights and civil liberty.” He was the leader of the defence team in the famous South African Treason Trial of 1956 to 1961 in which the accused, including Nelson Mandela, were all acquitted as well as numerous other cases in which he represented individuals adversely affected by the apartheid government's oppressive legislation. He served on the bench of the High Court of Southern Rhodesia from May 1961 to June 1963.

== Early life and education ==
Maisels was born in November 1905 in Johannesburg. His father, Henry, had come with his siblings and parents in the 1890s from Pokroy, a small village in Lithuania and his mother, Andzia, née Sieradski, from Łódź in Poland. He attended the Marist Brothers’ preparatory and high school and received his undergraduate and graduate degrees at the University of the Witwatersrand, Johannesburg, graduating from the law school in 1927. He married Muriel Maisels on 28 June 1934 and the couple had four children.

== Legal career ==
Following his graduation, he served in a firm of attorneys for two years as an “articled clerk” and was admitted to the Bar as an advocate of the Supreme Court of South Africa in 1930. In October 1932, Maisels was part of the legal team which defended Daisy de Melker, the second white woman executed for murder in South African history. In May 1940 he volunteered for the South African Armed Forces and was assigned to the Air Force Intelligence and dispatched to Nairobi, Kenya. He returned to South Africa in 1941 and was discharged from the Army with the rank of Major in October 1944. Prior to his discharge, he declined an offer of the position of Judge Advocate of the Armed Forces. His law practice grew rapidly, and he was appointed a King's Counsel (KC) in 1948 and Queen's Counsel (QC) following the death of King George VI. He served as chairman of the Johannesburg Bar Council from 1952 -1960 and was vice-chairman and acting chairman of the General Council of the South African Bar from 1954 – 1960. In his position as leader of the Johannesburg Bar, he opposed several pieces of oppressive legislation enacted by the government, including the Suppression of Communism Act which led to the persecution and imprisonment of many, but his commercial practice flourished. In 1956, a Vickers Viscount airplane operated by the Central African Airways (CAA) disintegrated over Tanzania, killing all passengers and crew. Maisels represented the CAA and was able to demonstrate that the crash was the result of metal fatigue due to faulty material. Vickers Armstrong paid all of the damages claimed as well as the legal costs. In 1960 David Pratt attempted to assassinate Hendrik Verwoerd, South Africa's Prime Minister, who survived the attack. Maisels defended Pratt who was found guilty but insane and committed to a mental institution where he committed suicide one year later.

Maisels represented the Consolidated Diamond Mines of South West Africa (CDMSWA) in what came to be known as “the great Southwest African Diamond Case.”

The CDMSWA was owned by the Anglo-American Corporation of which Sir Ernest Oppenheimer was the chairman. The case involved an area of some 10,000 miles of the West Coast of South-West Africa (now Namibia) and the question of the rights to prospect for diamonds between the high and low watermarks along the beaches. In a case that lasted more than one year, Maisels was successful in securing the sole and exclusive rights for CDMSWA.

Maisels is perhaps best known for his role as the leader of the defence team (that included Bram Fischer and Sydney Kentridge), in the South African Treason Trial in which 156 people of all races, including Chief Albert Luthuli, president of the African National Congress (ANC), Oliver Tambo, the ANC vice president and Nelson Mandela were arrested in December 1956 and charged with treason.

Following a preparatory examination which ended in January 1958, the charges against Luthuli, who gave evidence as a witness in the trial and Tambo were withdrawn and 91 individuals, including Nelson Mandela, were committed for trial. The trial which attracted much international attention was in two parts - the First and Second Indictment. The First Indictment commenced on 1 August 1958. The State's case was cumbersome and vague and, on 13 October 1958, it was withdrawn by the State after being picked apart by Maisels and his team. The State rallied, however, and the same trial, this time with fewer defendants (but including Mandela), commenced in August 1959.

Following the Preparatory Examination, when Maisels was approached by the accused to take charge of their defence, he insisted that the defence, in this case, be conducted strictly on legal, and not political, grounds. Although the defendants initially opposed this, it subsequently was proven to be the appropriate strategy. This Second Indictment was more specific than the First and alleged that the defendants intended a violent overthrow of the Apartheid government. The trial finally ended in March 1961 with the acquittal of all the accused. During the trial, Maisels cross-examined professor Andrew Murray who was called by the Crown as an expert on communism. In the cross-examination, Maisels enumerated the multiple discriminatory laws that had been passed for decades against the non-whites of South Africa and became increasingly harsh and more pervasive following 1948 when the Nationalist Party government came to power. Following this exchange, Maisels was approached by Duma Nokwe, a black lawyer who had been one of the initial accused but dismissed following the preparatory examination. He asked Maisels whether he had notes on his cross-examination and when asked why he said: “I would like to get those notes because I did not know things were quite so bad.” Following the Treason Trial, Maisels moved to Salisbury, Southern Rhodesia (now Harare, Zimbabwe) in 1961 where he served as a judge of the high court. Soon after his arrival, however, Northern Rhodesia withdrew from the Rhodesian Federation, and the Southern Rhodesian government was replaced by a right-wing party which led to the passage of increasingly harsh legislation which Maisels could not condone. He resigned his position in 1963 and returned to South Africa becoming an executive director of the OK Bazaars, the largest South African retail company of its time, where he worked for 7 years before returning to the Bar in 1970 where he rapidly resumed a busy practice.

In 1966 he was appointed as a Justice of the Appeal Courts of the former British Protectorates, Botswana, Lesotho and Swaziland. As these courts only sat for 2–3 months of the year, he continued his law practice at the Johannesburg Bar. He was subsequently appointed Judge President (Chief Justice) of all three countries and served until his retirement in 1987. In 1974 he represented the Rhodesian African National Congress in their talks with the then Rhodesian government at the Victoria Falls. In 1977 he served on a two-person commission of the Medical Association of South Africa to investigate the death in detention of Black consciousness leader Steve Biko.

== Service to the Jewish Community ==
Maisels was an observant Jew and deeply involved in Jewish and Zionist causes for his entire life. He served as the president of the United Hebrew Congregation and president of the South African Jewish Board of Deputies, the South African Zionist Federation and the Israel United Appeal. He was a member of the Board of Governors of Israel's Jewish Agency for 10 years and a Trustee of the Weizmann Institute. Israeli Prime Ministers whom he hosted, or who enjoyed the hospitality of his home, included Menachem Begin (at the time a member of Israel's opposition party), Moshe Sharett, Yitzchak Rabin and Ben Gurion (following his retirement).

== Honours ==
- 1978 Honorary Doctor of Laws, University of the Witwatersrand
- 1984 Commander of the Order of Mohlomi, by King Moshoeshoe ll, Kingdom of Lesotho
- 1990 Presidential Order of Honour, Republic of Botswana
- 1999 “They Shaped our Century. The Most Influential South Africans of the 20th century.” Human and Rousseau, Cape Town 2003, pp 472–476
- 2003 “Maisels Chambers” an office building for Johannesburg barristers, built and named for Isie Maisels and opened by President Mandela in 2003.

In 2024, at the South African Jewish Board of Deputies' 120th anniversary gala dinner, he was honoured among 100 remarkable Jewish South Africans who have contributed to South Africa. The ceremony included speeches from Chief Rabbi Ephraim Mirvis, and Maisels was honoured among other lawyers such as Sydney Kentridge and Bob Hepple.
