= Abraham Fischer =

South African politician

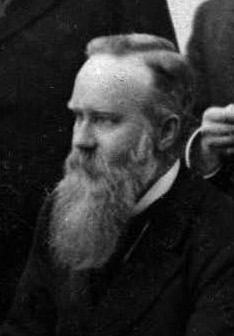
- Abraham Fischer in 1900

1st Prime Minister of the Orange River Colony
- In office 27 November 1907 – 31 May 1910
- Monarchs: Edward VII; George V
- Governor: Sir Hamilton John Goold-Adams
- Preceded by: Sir Hamilton John Goold-Adams; As Governor of the Orange River Colony
- Succeeded by: Louis Botha; As Prime Minister of South Africa

2nd Minister of the Interior of South Africa
- In office 1912 – 6 October 1913
- Monarch: George V
- Governor-General: The Viscount Gladstone
- Prime Minister: Louis Botha
- Preceded by: Jan Christiaan Smuts
- Succeeded by: Hendrik Schalk Theron

Personal details
- Born: Abraham Fischer; 4 September 1850 Green Point, Cape Town; Cape Colony
- Died: 16 November 1913 (aged 63) Cape Town, Cape Province; South Africa
- Resting place: Woltemade Cemetery, Cape Town
- Party: Orangia Unie
- Other political affiliations: South African Party
- Spouse: Ada Robertson
- Children: Harry Fischer, Percy Fischer
- Profession: Attorney, Politician

Abraham Fischer (9 April 1850 – 16 November 1913) was a South African statesman. He was the sole Prime Minister of the Orange River Colony in South Africa, and when that ceased to exist joined the cabinet of the newly formed Union of South Africa.

== Early life ==
Fischer was born on 9 April 1850 in Green Point, Cape Town in to Johannes Jacobus George Fischer, formerly of the Dutch East India Company, and Catherina Anna Margertha Brink.

== Biography ==
He was educated at the South African College, and became a lawyer in Cape Colony, joining the bar in 1875. In 1873 he married Ana Robertson (1851-1927), the daughter of Scottish immigrants to the Free State. He became interested in the politics of the Orange Free State, and in 1878 became a member of the Orange Free State's Volksraad. He became vice-president of the Volksraad in 1893, a member of the executive council in 1896, and took part in many colonial and interstate conferences. He headed a joint deputation from Transvaal and Orange Free State to Europe and America during the Boer War to solicit support for the Boers, returning in 1903 to practice law in the newly formed Orange River Colony.

Continuing to promote the Boer cause, he helped form the Orangia Unie party in May 1906 and became its chairman; the party won the majority of seats in the colony's first elections that were held in November 1907. On 27 November, he was chosen as Prime Minister, and stayed in that position until it ceased to exist with the union of 31 May 1910. He then joined the cabinet of the Union of South Africa as Minister of Lands. He was made Privy Councillor in 1911 and became Minister of the Interior and Lands in 1912.

He was the father of Percy Fischer, a Judge President of the Orange Free State. He was the grandfather of Bram Fischer, a noted anti-apartheid activist.
