= Leonora van den Heever =

South African judge (1926–2025)

The Honourable Leonora van den Heever

Judge of the Supreme Court of Appeal of South Africa
- In office 1991–1996

Judge of the High Court of South Africa
- In office 1969–1990

Personal details
- Born: 9 July 1926 Windhoek, Southwest Africa
- Died: 20 November 2025 (aged 99) Cape Town, South Africa
- Spouse: Christo Neethling
- Parent: Toon van den Heever (father)
- Education: University of Pretoria; University of the Free State

Leonora van den Heever (9 July 1926 – 20 November 2025) was a judge of the High Court of South Africa. She was South Africa's first female judge and the first woman to be appointed a judge of the Supreme Court of Appeal of South Africa.

== Early life and education ==
Van den Heever was born in Windhoek, the daughter of the jurist and poet Toon van den Heever and Margaretha van den Heever (née Rautenbach). She attended the C&N Sekondêre Meisieskool Oranje in Bloemfontein, after which she completed her tertiary studies at the University of Pretoria, where she obtained, cum laude, her BA degree in English and Latin followed by a MA degree, cum laude, in English. She then taught at the Normaalkollege in Bloemfontein but, persuaded by her father, she temporarily started working as a judge's registrar and also began her LLB part-time through the University of the Orange Free State, graduating in 1951.

== Career ==
Van den Heever started practising as an advocate at the Bloemfontein Bar in 1952 and in 1968 she became a senior advocate. In 1969, she was appointed a judge in the Northern Cape Division, thus becoming the first female judge in South Africa. In 1979, she began to serve on the Bench of the Cape Provincial Division and from time to time during 1982 to 1985, she was part of the Bophuthatswana Court of Appeal.

In 1991, she became the first female judge to be appointed permanently to the appellate division of the South African Supreme Court in Bloemfontein where she served until, she retired. After retiring at age 70, she agreed to some work in the Cape Provincial Division and served for a number of years on the Appeal Benches of Lesotho and Swaziland.

== Other interests ==
Van den Heever continued her love of literature, by writing two published children's books, as well as writing short stories under a pseudonym, for Sarie Magazine. She also acted as a trustee of the Ballet Benevolent Fund for CAPAB and as a board member of the SA Youth Orchestra and was also chairperson of the SA Library board.

== Death ==
Van den Heever died in Cape Town on 20 November 2025, at the age of 99.

== Honours and awards ==
Van den Heever received the Chancellor's Medal from the University of Pretoria in 1996, an honorary LLD from the University of Stellenbosch in 1997 and in 1987 the Women's Bureau Achievement Award.

== See also ==
- List of first women lawyers and judges in Africa
