= Neil Turok =

South African theoretical physicist

Neil Turok OC HonFInstP FRS
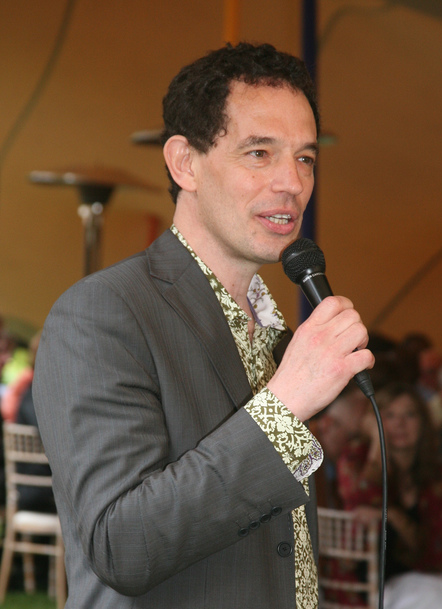
- Turok in 2008
- Born: Neil Geoffrey Turok; 16 November 1958 (age 67); Johannesburg, South Africa
- Education: Churchill College, Cambridge; Imperial College London; UCSB; Fermilab
- Known for: Ekpyrotic universe Brane cosmology Hawking–Turok instanton solutions African Institute for Mathematical Sciences
- Awards: Maxwell Medal and Prize (1992)
- Scientific career
- Fields: Cosmology
- Workplaces: University of Edinburgh; Princeton University; University of Cambridge; Perimeter Institute for Theoretical Physics
- Thesis: Strings and Solitons in Gauge Theories (1983)
- Doctoral advisor: David Olive

Neil Geoffrey Turok OC HonFInstP FRS (born 16 November 1958) is a South African physicist. He has held the Higgs Chair of Theoretical Physics at the University of Edinburgh since 2020, and has been director emeritus of the Perimeter Institute for Theoretical Physics since 2019. He specializes in mathematical physics and early-universe physics, including the cosmological constant and a cyclic model for the universe.

== Early life and career ==
Turok was born on 16 November 1958 in Johannesburg, South Africa, to Mary Turok and Byelorussian-born Ben Turok, who were activists in the anti-apartheid movement and the African National Congress. After graduating from Churchill College, Cambridge, Turok gained his doctorate from Imperial College, London, under the supervision of David Olive, one of the inventors of superstring theory. After a postdoctoral post at Santa Barbara, he was an associate scientist at Fermilab, Illinois.

In 1992 Turok was awarded the Maxwell medal of the Institute of Physics for his contributions to theoretical physics. In 1994 he was appointed Professor of Physics at Princeton University, then held the Chair of Mathematical Physics at the University of Cambridge starting in 1997. He was appointed Director of the Perimeter Institute in 2008. In 2020, Turok was appointed as the Inaugural Higgs Chair of Theoretical Physics at the University of Edinburgh.

== Research and other contributions ==
Turok has worked in a number of areas of mathematical physics and early universe physics, focusing on observational tests of fundamental physics in cosmology. In the early 1990s, his group showed how the polarisation and temperature anisotropies of the Cosmic microwave background would be correlated, a prediction which has been confirmed in detail by recent precision measurements by the WMAP spacecraft. They also developed a key test for the presence of a cosmological constant, also recently confirmed.

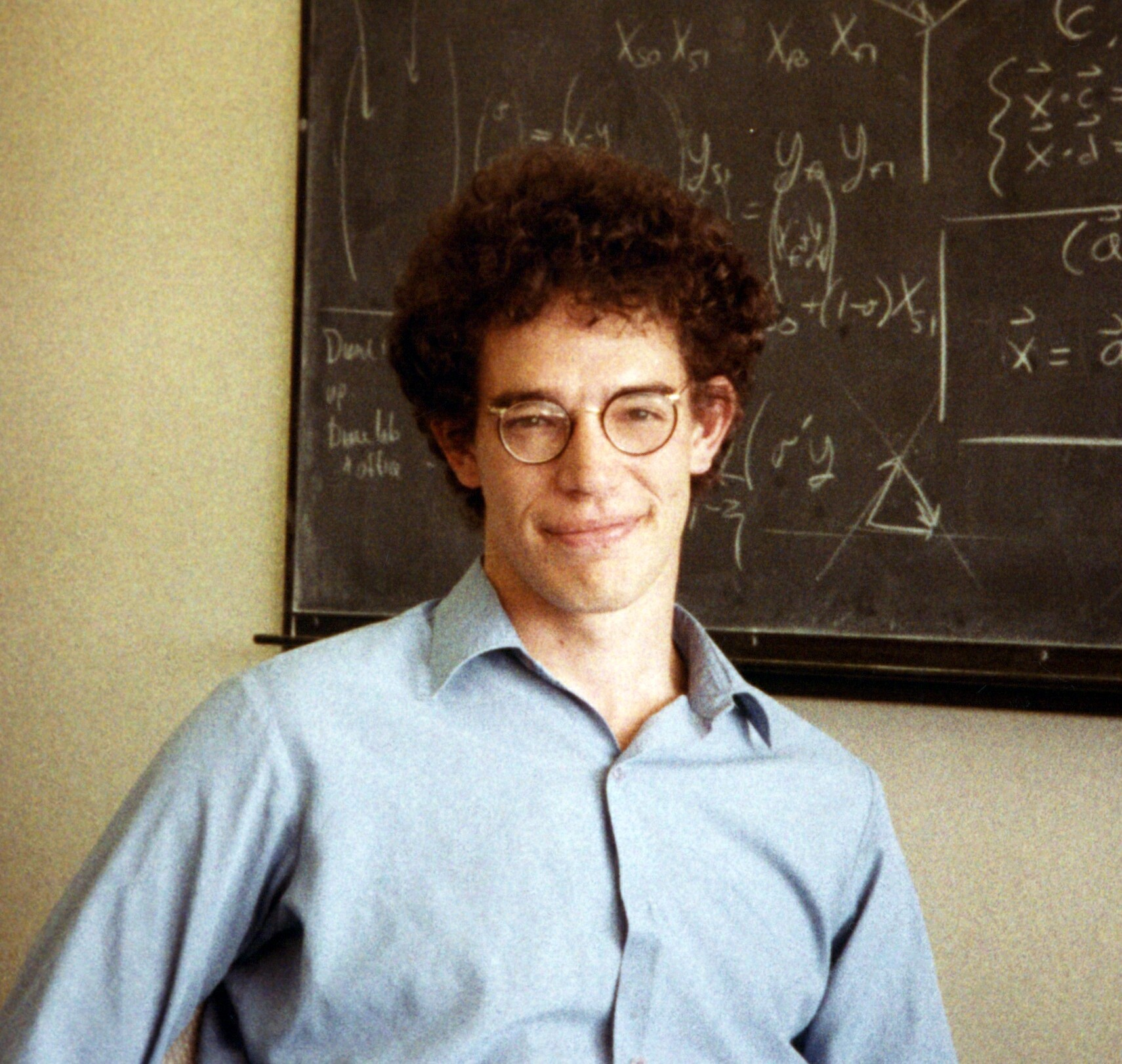
Turok c. 1990

Turok and collaborators developed the theory of open inflation. With Stephen Hawking, he later developed the so-called Hawking-Turok instanton solutions which, according to the no-boundary proposal of Hawking and James Hartle, can describe the birth of an inflationary universe.

Together with Justin Khoury, Burt Ovrut and Paul Steinhardt, Turok introduced the notion of the Ekpyrotic Universe, "... a cosmological model in which the hot big bang universe is produced by the collision of a brane in the bulk space with a bounding orbifold plane, beginning from an otherwise cold, vacuous, static universe". Most recently, with Paul Steinhardt at Princeton, Turok has been developing a cyclic model for the universe, in which the big bang is explained as a collision between two "brane-worlds" in M theory. The predictions of this model are in agreement with current cosmological data, but there are interesting differences with the predictions of cosmological inflation which will be probed by future experiments (probably by the Planck space observatory). In 2006, Steinhardt and Turok showed how the cyclic model could naturally incorporate a mechanism for relaxing the cosmological constant to very small values, consistent with current observations. In 2007, Steinhardt and Turok co-authored the popular science book Endless Universe. In 2012, Turok's Massey Lectures were published as The Universe Within: from Quantum to Cosmos.

In 2003, Turok founded the African Institute for Mathematical Sciences in Muizenberg, a postgraduate educational centre supporting the development of mathematics and science across the African continent.

== Awards and honours ==
He was awarded the 2008 TED Prize for his work in mathematical physics and in establishing the African Institute for Mathematical Sciences in Muizenberg. He also received a "Most Innovative People Award," for Social Innovation, at the World Summit on Innovation and Entrepreneurship (WSIE) in 2008.

On 9 May 2008, Mike Lazaridis announced that Turok would become the new Executive Director of the Perimeter Institute for Theoretical Physics starting on 1 October 2008.

In 2010 Turok received a prize from the World Innovation Summit for Education in Qatar and an award from the South African Mathematical Society. In 2011 Turok received an Honorary Doctorate from the University of Ottawa.

On 3 November 2011, Turok was selected to deliver the Massey Lectures for the 2012 season. This involves five separate lectures to be delivered in various locations across Canada in October 2012, aired on CBC's Ideas shortly thereafter.

Turok received an honorary doctorate from Heriot-Watt University in 2012.

In 2012 Turok was the recipient of the Lane Anderson Award for his book The Universe Within: From Quantum to Cosmos.

Turok was awarded the honorary degrees of Doctor of Science, honoris causa from UCLouvain (4 February 2019), Saint Mary's University (16 May 2014), the Nelson Mandela Metropolitan University (9 April 2014) and Stellenbosch University (26 March 2015).

Turok was awarded the 2016 John Torrence Tate Award at the 2016 SPS Quadrennial Congress in San Francisco.

He was elected a Fellow of the Royal Society in 2026.

Academic offices
Preceded by Howard Burton	Director of the Perimeter Institute for Theoretical Physics; 2008-2019	Succeeded by Robert Myers
