= Rusty Bernstein =

South African anti-apartheid activist

- Lionel and Hilda Bernstein
- Born: Lionel Bernstein; 20 March 1920; Durban, Natal, Union of South Africa
- Died: 23 June 2002 (aged 82); Cape Town, South Africa
- Other name: Rusty
- Occupation: Architect
- Known for: Anti-apartheid activism
- Spouse(s): Hilda Bernstein (nee Schwarz), m. 1941
- Awards: Order of Luthuli in gold (2011)

Lionel "Rusty" Bernstein (20 March 1920 – 23 June 2002) was a Jewish South African anti-apartheid activist and political prisoner. He played a key role in political organizations such as the South African Communist Party (SACP) and the African National Congress (ANC). He helped form the South African Congress of Democrats to bolster white participation in the ANC, and he brought its allies together to establish a Congress of the People, working closely with Nelson Mandela.

The anti-apartheid movement drew the ire of the South African government. They imposed severe restrictions on the movement, such as banning a publication Bernstein edited, banning a party he organized with, and detaining leaders including him for long periods of time. These actions culminated in him fleeing his home country after being detained following a police raid.

To participate in the first post-apartheid elections in 1994, he returned to South Africa and resumed working for the ANC. Many institutions bestowed honours on him for his activism, and he remains a celebrated figure in Africa.

== Early life ==
Bernstein was born on 20 March 1920 in Durban, Union of South Africa, the youngest of four children of Jewish émigrés from Europe. He was orphaned at eight years of age, and brought up by relatives, after which he was sent to finish his education at Hilton College, a private boys' boarding school.

After matriculating, he returned to Johannesburg, where he started work at an architect's office, while studying architecture part-time at the University of the Witwatersrand. Bernstein was inspired by an "extraordinary third-year student", Kurt Jonas, the son of German Jewish migrants. Through Jonas, at Florian's Coffee House in Hillbrow he first learned of "the invisible world of black workers and trade unions which existed on my own doorstep." After qualifying in 1936, he worked full-time as an architect.

== Early political activism ==
In 1937, he joined the Labour League of Youth. Later, he joined the South African Communist Party, where he soon played a leading role. For one year he forsook architecture to work as a full-time Party official and Secretary of the Johannesburg District of the Communist Party. In March 1941, he married Hilda (née Schwarz), an immigrant from Britain, whom he had met in the Labour League of Youth.

That year he volunteered for the South African Army and later served as a gunner in North Africa and Italy. He was repatriated and discharged from the army at the beginning of 1946. During the strike of African miners in 1946, he produced the strike bulletin. After the strike both he and his wife were arrested together with others and charged with sedition. They were ultimately convicted of aiding an illegal strike and received suspended sentences.

Over the next quarter of a century, he wrote extensively for the a number of journals, including Liberation and the South African newspaper The Guardian. He edited Fighting Talk ( which became a banned publication), a paper for ex-servicemen. This carried the same message as his other writings; that South Africa was approaching its last chance to make a peaceful transition to democracy. Once he was banned, he continued to write under several pseudonyms.

In 1950, the South African Communist Party (SACP) was banned. All SACP members became subject to various restrictions, including a ban on being published. After this, Bernstein took part with others in forming an underground Communist Party. He was prominent in forming the Congress of Democrats, an organisation for whites that could co-operate with the African National Congress (ANC), which at that time was restricted to black membership only. This Congress Alliance drew in radical trade unions, and many other non-racial political organisations.

== Congress of the People ==
In 1954, the ANC called together its allies to a joint meeting in Natal. This included the South African Indian Congress, the South African Congress of Democrats (COD), the South African Congress of Trade Unions (SACTU), and the Coloured Peoples' Congress. It was at this historic meeting that it was decided to convene a Congress of the People where a Freedom Charter would be adopted.

Bernstein played a major part on the committee organising the Congress, and worked very closely with Nelson Mandela, Walter Sisulu and Oliver Tambo. Although often credited with the drafting of the Freedom Charter, his own memoirs dispel this. He was actually given the responsibility of drafting the Freedom Charter from the thousands of demands coming in from all over the country. His written words became a rallying call for those struggling for national liberation from that time on; "Let Us Speak of Freedom. South Africa belongs to all who live in it, black and white." The Freedom Charter became the basic document for the ANC for the next 40 years but split the liberation movement into two when one section of the ANC broke away in protest to form the Pan Africanist Congress in April 1959.

By 1953, both he and his wife became subject to bans and restrictions that prohibited them from belonging to or taking part in the activities of numerous organisations including non-political bodies such as parent teacher associations.

At the end of 1956, Bernstein and 155 others were arrested and charged with treason. The infamous Treason Trial lasted for more than four years after which all the accused were found not guilty and discharged.

In 1960, the Sharpeville massacre took place; Bernstein and his wife were both among those arrested and detained under the state of emergency that followed. He was not released until five months later when the state of emergency was lifted. In 1962, he was placed under house arrest and allowed out only on weekdays between 6:00 am and 6:00 pm.

== Rivonia Trial ==
His covert ANC and South African Communist Party activities led up to the police raid on Liliesleaf Farm, Rivonia, where he and ten other prominent ANC leaders were arrested on 11 July 1963. Bernstein was held in solitary confinement under the notorious Ninety Days detention law. At the end of ninety days, he was charged together with Nelson Mandela and others, in what became known as the Rivonia Trial. At the end of the trial, the remaining men were all found guilty and sentenced to life imprisonment. Bernstein was the only one found not guilty and he was discharged.

He was immediately re-arrested while leaving the dock and later released on bail. Shortly after his release, the police came to arrest his wife, Hilda, but she managed to escape from their home and went into hiding.

== Life in exile ==
The Bernsteins decided to leave South Africa for the sake of their children, who would be left without their parents for a very long time if both of them were sent to prison. Also, their activities were now so circumscribed, they felt they had become a danger to all who associated with them. They left their children in the care of their eldest daughter and her husband, and crossed the border to Botswana on foot. Their flight across the border and subsequent journey is described in Hilda's book The World That Was Ours.

The Bernsteins eventually made their way into Northern Rhodesia. Despite Northern Rhodesia being well on the way to independence within the Commonwealth as Zambia, and the ANC being well respected by the new incoming authorities, they were declared prohibited immigrants by the British authorities. They then travelled overland to Tanzania and eventually to England, where their children joined them one by one. Bernstein worked as an architect in London.

Despite leaving the country of his birth, he continued to work tirelessly for the abolition of apartheid without drawing a salary from the ANC, preferring to earn his living independently. In 1987, he conducted a series of seminars for the ANC in Moscow, on the history of South Africa's liberation struggles. He also spent a year in Tanzania at the ANC's Solomon Mahlangu Freedom College setting up a political science school and teaching the history of the freedom struggle to young South African political exiles.

== Return to South Africa, later life and death ==
Bernstein returned to South Africa for four months in 1994 for the first post-apartheid elections and worked in the ANC press office during this time, with particular responsibility for ensuring mass white participation in the first non-racial elections to take place in South Africa.

In 1998, the Bernsteins were awarded honorary degrees from the University of Natal for their role in helping to bring democracy to South Africa. This followed the publication of Bernstein's acclaimed book on the unwritten history of South African politics between 1938 and 1964.

Bernstein died at his Oxford, England home on 23 June 2002, aged 82. He was posthumously made a member of the Order of Luthuli (Gold), "For his political activism, abandoning privilege and dedicating his adult life to the struggle for liberation, democracy, human rights and peace, and for striving to build a better Africa and a better world through the anti-apartheid crusade."

In March 2011, the country of The Gambia issued a postage stamp in Bernstein's honour, naming him as one of the Legendary Heroes of Africa.

== Legacy ==
In 2024, at the South African Jewish Board of Deputies' 120th anniversary gala dinner, he was honoured among 100 remarkable Jewish South Africans who have contributed to South Africa. The ceremony included speeches from Chief Rabbi Ephraim Mirvis, and Bernstein was honoured with other anti-apartheid activists, Helen Suzman, Ruth First and Joe Slovo.

== See also ==
- Solomon Mahlangu Freedom College
- List of people subject to banning orders under apartheid

== Notes and references ==
- Bernstein, Rusty (1999). Memory against forgetting: memoirs from a life in South African politics. Viking. ISBN 978-0-670-88792-7.
- Alan Lipman. "Review of Memory Against Forgetting, South African History 1935 to 1964, by Rusty Bernstein". The Sunday Independent (South Africa).
- Bernstein, Hilda (1989). The World that was Ours: The Story of the Rivonia Trial. SAWriters. ISBN 978-1-872086-01-9.
- Morrow, Seán; Maaba, Brown; Pulumani, Loyiso (2002). "Revolutionary Schooling? Studying the Solomon Mahlangu Freedom College, the African National Congress Liberation School in Tanzania, 1978 to 1992". World Studies in Education. 3 (1): 23–37. doi:10.7459/wse/03.1.03. ISSN 1441-340X.
