= Congress Alliance =

Anti-apartheid political coalition in South Africa (1950s)

- Founded: 26 June 1955
- Dissolved: December 1956
- Merger of: ANC; CPSA; SAIC; SACTU; CPC; COD
- Headquarters: Tongaat
- Ideology: Anti-Apartheid; Anti-racism; Revolutionary Socialism; Marxism; African-Indian unity Pan-Africanism; Third Worldism; Left-wing nationalism
- Political position: Left-wing to Far-left
- Party program: Freedom Charter

The Congress Alliance was an anti-apartheid political coalition formed in South Africa in the 1950s. Led by the African National Congress, the CA was multi-racial in makeup and committed to the principle of majority rule.

== Congress of the People and the Freedom Charter ==
The National Action Council was made up of executives of the African National Congress, the Communist Party of South Africa, the South African Indian Congress (SAIC), the South African Congress of Trade Unions (SACTU), the Coloured People's Congress (CPC) and the South African Congress of Democrats (COD) met in Tongaat on 23 June 1955. This group, who became known as the Congress Alliance, developed the document known as the Freedom Charter and planned the Congress of the People, a large multi-racial gathering held over two days at Kliptown on 26 June 1955. At this rally, the Charter was read out in three languages (English, Sotho and Xhosa), and discussed by various delegates.

The Charter was the statement of core principles of the Alliance, which included a commitment to multi-racial democratic government and a fundamental restructuring of all aspects of South African Society. The Alliance was part of the ANC's efforts to promote a multi-racial anti-apartheid movement.

Other organisations associated with the Congress Alliance included the Federation of South African Women.

== Arrests ==
In December 1956 many key members of the Alliance were arrested and charged with treason, including the entire executive committee of the ANC. 105 Africans, 21 Indians, 23 whites (about half of whom were South African Jews), and 7 Coloured members of the Congress Alliance were arrested. Many leaders, including Nelson Mandela, were detained in communal cells in Johannesburg Prison, resulting in "the largest and longest unbanned meeting of the Congress Alliance in years."

These arrests led to the 1956 Treason Trial, which lasted until 1961 but led to the eventual acquittal of all charged.

== See also ==
- Tripartite Alliance
