= Freedom Charter =

Manifesto of the South African Congress Alliance

The Freedom Charter was a statement of core principles of the South African Congress Alliance, which consisted of the African National Congress (ANC) and its allies, the South African Indian Congress, the South African Congress of Democrats and the Coloured People's Congress. It was adopted in 1955 and is characterised by its opening demand, "The People Shall Govern!"

== History ==
After about a decade of multi-faceted resistance to white minority rule, and in the wake of the Defiance Campaign of 1952, the work to create the Freedom Charter was in part a response to an increasingly repressive government bent on stamping out extra-parliamentary dissent. In 1955, the ANC sent out 50,000 volunteers into townships and the countryside to collect "freedom demands" from the people of South Africa. This system was designed to give all South Africans equal rights. Demands such as "Land to be given to all landless people", "Living wages and shorter hours of work", "Free and compulsory education, irrespective of colour, race or nationality" were synthesised into the final document by ANC leaders including Z.K. Mathews, Lionel "Rusty" Bernstein, Ethel Drus, Ruth First and Alan Lipman (whose wife, Beata Lipman, hand-wrote the original Charter).

The Charter was officially adopted on Sunday 26 June 1955 at a gathering of about 3,000 people, known as the Congress of the People in Kliptown, Soweto. The meeting was broken up by police on the second day, although by then the Charter had been read in full. The crowd had shouted its approval of each section with cries of "Africa!" and "Mayibuye!" Nelson Mandela escaped the police by disguising himself as a milkman, as his movements and interactions were restricted by banning orders at the time.

The document signified a major break with the past traditions of the struggle; this was no longer a civil rights movement seeking to be accommodated in the existing structures of society, but called for a fundamental restructuring of all aspects of South African society. The document is notable for its demand for and commitment to a non-racial South Africa, and this has remained the platform of the ANC. As a result, ANC members who held pro-African views left the ANC after it adopted the charter, forming the Pan Africanist Congress. The charter also calls for democracy and human rights, land reform, labour rights, and nationalisation.

After the Congress was denounced as treason, the South African government banned the ANC and arrested 156 activists, including Mandela, who were put on trial in the 1956 Treason Trial, in which all were acquitted. The Charter continued to circulate in the revolutionary underground and inspired a new generation of young militants in the 1980s.

When the ANC finally came to power after democratic elections in 1994, the new Constitution of South Africa included many of the demands of the Freedom Charter. It addressed directly nearly all of the demands for equality of race and language.

The original document is housed at Liliesleaf Farm, now a museum.

== Freedom Charter ==
The following is the full text of the Freedom Charter.

We, the People of South Africa, declare for all our country and the world to know: that South Africa belongs to all who live in it, black and white, and that no government can justly claim authority unless it is based on the will of all the people; that our people have been robbed of their birthright to land, liberty and peace by a form of government founded on injustice and inequality; that our country will never be prosperous or free until all our people live in brotherhood, enjoying equal rights and opportunities; that only a democratic state, based on the will of all the people, can secure to all their birthright without distinction of colour, race, sex or belief; And therefore, we, the people of South Africa, black and white together - equals, countrymen and brothers - adopt this Freedom Charter. And we pledge ourselves to strive together, sparing neither strength nor courage, until the democratic changes here set out have been won.

=== The People Shall Govern! ===
Every man and woman shall have the right to vote for and to stand as a candidate for all bodies which make laws;
All people shall be entitled to take part in the administration of the country;
The rights of the people shall be the same, regardless of race, colour or sex;
All bodies of minority rule, advisory boards, councils and authorities shall be replaced by democratic organs of self-government.

=== All National Groups Shall Have Equal Rights! ===
There shall be equal status in the bodies of state, in the courts and in the schools for all national groups and races;
All people shall have equal right to use their own languages, and to develop their own folk culture and customs;
All national groups shall be protected by law against insults to their race and national pride;
The preaching and practice of national, race or colour discrimination and contempt shall be a punishable crime;
All apartheid laws and practices shall be set aside.

=== The People Shall Share in the Country's Wealth! ===
The national wealth of our country, the heritage of all South Africans, shall be restored to the people;
The mineral wealth beneath the soil, the banks and monopoly industry shall be transferred to the ownership of the people as a whole;
All other industry and trade shall be controlled to assist the well-being of the people;
All people shall have equal rights to trade where they choose, to manufacture and to enter all trades, crafts and professions.

=== The Land Shall Be Shared Among Those Who Work It! ===
Restrictions of land ownership on a racial basis shall be ended, and all the land redivided amongst those who work it, to banish famine and land hunger;
The state shall help the peasants with implements, seed, tractors and dams to save the soil and assist the tillers;
Freedom of movement shall be guaranteed to all who work on the land;
All shall have the right to occupy land wherever they choose;
People shall not be robbed of their cattle, and forced labour and farm prisons shall be abolished.

=== All Shall Be Equal Before The Law! ===
No one shall be imprisoned, deported or restricted without a fair trial;
No one shall be condemned by the order of any Government official;
The courts shall be representative of all the people;
Imprisonment shall be only for serious crimes against the people, and shall aim at re-education, not vengeance;
The police force and army shall be open to all on an equal basis and shall be the helpers and protectors of the people;
All laws which discriminate on grounds of race, colour or belief shall be repealed.

=== All Shall Enjoy Equal Human Rights! ===
The law shall guarantee to all their right to speak, to organise, to meet together, to publish, to preach, to worship and to educate their children;
The privacy of the house from police raids shall be protected by law;
All shall be free to travel without restriction from countryside to town, from province to province, and from South Africa abroad;
Pass Laws, permits and all other laws restricting these freedoms shall be abolished.

=== There Shall Be Work And Security! ===
All who work shall be free to form trade unions, to elect their officers and to make wage agreements with their employers;
The state shall recognise the right and duty of all to work, and to draw full unemployment benefits;
Men and women of all races shall receive equal pay for equal work;
There shall be a forty-hour working week, a national minimum wage, paid annual leave, and sick leave for all workers, and maternity leave on full pay for all working mothers;
Miners, domestic workers, farm workers and civil servants shall have the same rights as all others who work;
Child labour, compound labour, the tot system and contract labour shall be abolished.

=== The Doors of Learning And of Culture Shall Be Opened! ===
The government shall discover, develop and encourage national talent for the enhancement of our cultural life;
All the cultural treasures of mankind shall be open to all, by free exchange of books, ideas and contact with other lands;
The aim of education shall be to teach the youth to love their people and their culture, to honour human brotherhood, liberty and peace;
Education shall be free, compulsory, universal and equal for all children;
Higher education and technical training shall be opened to all by means of state allowances and scholarships awarded on the basis of merit;
Adult illiteracy shall be ended by a mass state education plan;
Teachers shall have all the rights of other citizens;
The colour bar in cultural life, in sport and in education shall be abolished.

=== There Shall Be Houses, Security And Comfort! ===
All people shall have the right to live where they choose, to be decently housed, and to bring up their families in comfort and security;
Unused housing space to be made available to the people;
Rent and prices shall be lowered, food plentiful and no one shall go hungry;
A preventive health scheme shall be run by the state;
Free medical care and hospitalisation shall be provided for all, with special care for mothers and young children;
Slums shall be demolished, and new suburbs built where all have transport, roads, lighting, playing fields, creches and social centres;
The aged, the orphans, the disabled and the sick shall be cared for by the state;
Rest, leisure and recreation shall be the right of all;
Fenced locations and ghettoes shall be abolished, and laws which break up families shall be repealed.

=== There Shall Be Peace And Friendship! ===
South Africa shall be a fully independent state, which respects the rights and sovereignty of all nations;
South Africa shall strive to maintain world peace and the settlement of all international disputes by negotiation-not war;
Peace and friendship amongst all our people shall be secured by upholding the equal rights, opportunities and status of all;
The people of the protectorates-Basutoland, Bechuanaland and Swaziland-shall be free to decide for themselves their own future;
The right of all the peoples of Africa to independence and self-government shall be recognized and shall be the basis of close co-operation.

Let all who love their people and their country now say, as we say here:

'THESE FREEDOMS WE WILL FIGHT FOR, SIDE BY SIDE, THROUGHOUT OUR LIVES, UNTIL WE HAVE WON OUR LIBERTY.'

Adopted at the Congress of the People, Kliptown, South Africa, on 26 June 1955.
