= Percy Fischer =

South African judge of the Orange Free State

The Honourable Percy Fischer KC

Judge President of the Orange Free State Provincial Division of the Supreme Court of South Africa
- In office 1939–1948
- Preceded by: C. L. Botha
- Succeeded by: Toon van den Heever

Judge of the Orange Free State Provincial Division of the Supreme Court of South Africa
- In office 1929–1939

Personal details
- Born: Percy Ulrich Fischer; 22 March 1878 Bloemfontein, Orange Free State
- Died: 10 June 1957 (aged 79) Bloemfontein, Orange Free State, Union of South Africa
- Children: Bram Fischer
- Parent: Abraham Fischer (father)
- Education: South African College; Trinity Hall, Cambridge

Percy Ulrich Fischer (22 March 1878 – 10 June 1957) was a South African judge president of the Orange Free State Provincial Division of the Supreme Court of South Africa. He was the son of politician Abraham Fischer and the father of the lawyer Bram Fischer.

== Early life and education ==
Fischer was the son of Abraham Fischer and his wife, Ada Robertson. He received his schooling at Grey College in Bloemfontein and in 1895 continued his studies at the South African College, where he obtained his BA degree. He then went to the United Kingdom and studied law at Trinity Hall, Cambridge and was admitted to the Middle Temple in 1900.

== Career ==
He then returned to Bloemfontein and in 1904 he began practicing as an advocate. In 1924 he became King's Counsel and on 9 September 1929 he was appointed a judge in the Orange Free State Division of the Supreme Court. Fischer served as puisne judge for ten years, after which he was appointed judge president of the Orange Free State Division in 1939.

== Personal life ==
Fischer married Ella Fichardt in 1907 and there were four sons and a daughter born out of their marriage. His eldest son, Bram Fischer, became an advocate in Johannesburg, was an anti-apartheid activist and was sentenced to life imprisonment.
