= Bram Fischer =

South African lawyer (1908–1975)

Abram Fischer
- Born: Abram Fischer; 23 April 1908; Bloemfontein, Orange River Colony
- Died: 8 May 1975 (aged 67); Bloemfontein, South Africa
- Occupation: Advocate
- Political party: South African Communist Party
- Spouse: Molly Krige (m. 1937; died 1964)
- Awards: Order for Meritorious Service in gold (2003); Lenin Peace Prize; Posthumous honorary doctorate, Stellenbosch University

Abram Fischer (23 April 1908 – 8 May 1975) was a South African Communist lawyer of Afrikaner descent with partial Anglo-African ancestry from his paternal grandmother, notable for anti-apartheid activism and for the legal defence of anti-apartheid figures, including Nelson Mandela, at the Rivonia Trial. Following the trial, he was himself put on trial accused of furthering communism. He was sentenced to life imprisonment and diagnosed with cancer while in prison. The South African Prisons Act was extended to include his brother's house in Bloemfontein, where he died two months later.

== Family and education ==
Fischer came from a prominent Afrikaner family; his father was Percy Fischer (1878–1957), a judge president of the Orange Free State and his grandfather was Abraham Fischer (1850–1913), a prime minister of the Orange River Colony and later a member of the cabinet of the unified South Africa.

Prior to studying at University of Oxford (New College) as a Rhodes scholar during the 1930s, he was schooled at Grey College and Grey University College in Bloemfontein, he was a resident of House Abraham Fischer which is named after his grandfather Abraham Fischer. During his stay at Oxford, he travelled on the European continent, including a trip in 1932 to the Soviet Union. In a letter to his parents during his trip indicating that he had become radicalized, he noted similarities between the position of Russian farmers that he encountered along the Volga river and South African blacks.

In 1937, Fischer married Molly Krige, a niece of Jan Smuts; the couple had three children. Their son, Paul died of cystic fibrosis at the age of 23 while Fischer was in prison. Molly became involved in politics and was detained without trial during the 1960 state of emergency declared after the Sharpeville massacre. In 1964, Bram, Molly and a friend, Liz Franklin, were driving to Cape Town for daughter Ilse's 21st birthday. Bram swerved the car to avoid hitting a cow that had strayed onto the road. The car veered off the road and overturned into a river, causing Molly to drown.

== Professional and political activities ==
Fischer joined the Communist Party of South Africa (CPSA) in the 1940s and soon rose to leadership positions. The CPSA had a close relationship with the African National Congress (ANC) and in 1943, Fischer co-authored revisions to the constitution of the ANC. In 1946 he was charged with incitement arising out of his position as a leader of the CPSA and the African Mine Workers' Strike of that year. After the CPSA was dissolved and banned in 1950, he became Chairman of the illegal South African Communist Party when it was established underground in 1953.

Alongside Issy Maisels and others, Fischer played an integral role on the defense team in the Treason Trial of 1956 – 1961 where Mandela and many other anti-apartheid activists were acquitted on 29 March 1961. In his autobiography, Mandela affectionately recalls Fischer reading the left wing publication New Age at his table during the trial proceedings.

Fischer led Nelson Mandela's legal defence team at the Rivonia Trial of 1963 – 1964. By a coincidence, Fischer had not been present at the raid on Liliesleaf Farm, although he had in fact been part of the trusted Rivonia inner circle. A number of documents seized by authorities were in his handwriting.

Mandela and co-defendants were sentenced to life imprisonment instead of the death penalty, which the state prosecutor Percy Yutar had been asking for. This was considered a victory for the defence. International pressure also played a role. At this time, Fischer's role as leader of the SACP was unknown even to his closest white friends.

After the verdict, Bram Fischer visited the Rivonia trial prisoners on Robben Island to discuss the question of an appeal in their case. Wishing to protect the prisoners, he did not tell them of his wife’s death one week earlier. After the meeting, Mandela learned about Mrs. Fischer's death and wrote to Fischer, a letter that his prison guards never delivered. A few days later, Fischer was himself arrested, held in solitary confinement for three days and then released. On 23 September 1964, he was again arrested and joined the 12 white men and women facing charges of being members of the illegal South African Communist Party.

The 1964 State versus Abram Fischer legal procedure accused Abram Fischer of:

- (1) Sabotage in contravention of section 21(1) of Act No. 76 of 1962;
- (2) Contravening section 11(c) with sections 3(1)(a)(i), 1, 2(1), 11(i) and 12 of Act No. 44 of 1950 as amended;
- (3) & (4) Contravening section 11(c) with sections read with sections 3(1)(a)(iv), 1, 2(1), 11(i) and 12 of Act No. 44 of 1950 as amended;
- (6) & (7) Contravening section 11(a) read with sections 1, 2(1), 11(i) and 12 of Act No. 44 of 1950 as amended;
- (8) - (13) Fraud, alternatively, contravening section 9(1) read with section 10 of Act 1 of 1937, alternatively to count 11, Forgery & Uttering;
- (14) Forgery & Uttering;
- (15) Forgery & Uttering.

Fischer was released on bail to handle a patent case in London. He applied for bail to attend to his case. In his appeal to the Court in the bail application, he stated:

I am an Afrikaner. My home is in South Africa. I will not leave my country because my political beliefs conflict with those of the Government.

Fischer returned to South Africa to face trial despite pressure put on him to forgo his £5,000 bail and go into exile. One day, after proceedings began, he did not arrive at Court and instead sent a letter to his counsel, Harold Hanson, which was read out in court. He wrote:

By the time this reaches you I shall be a long way from Johannesburg and shall absent myself from the remainder of the trial. But I shall still be in the country to which I said I would return when I was granted bail. I wish you to inform the Court that my absence, though deliberate, is not intended in any way to be disrespectful. Nor is it prompted by any fear of the punishment which might be inflicted on me. Indeed I realise fully that my eventual punishment may be increased by my present conduct...

My decision was made only because I believe that it is the duty of every true opponent of this Government to remain in this country and to oppose its monstrous policy of apartheid with every means in his power. That is what I shall do for as long as I can...

What is needed is for White South Africans to shake themselves out of their complacency, a complacency intensified by the present economic boom built upon racial discrimination. Unless this whole intolerable system is changed radically and rapidly, disaster must follow. Appalling bloodshed and civil war will become inevitable because, as long as there is oppression of a majority, such oppression will be fought with increasing hatred.

Fischer went underground to support the liberation struggle against apartheid. In doing so, he went against the advice of Mandela, who had advised him to support the struggle in the courtroom, "where people could see this Afrikaner son of a judge president fighting for the rights of the powerless. But he could not let others suffer while he remained free. […] Bram did not want to ask others to make a sacrifice that he was unwilling to make himself."

Fischer was struck off the advocate's roll in 1965 in a trial completed in his absence. Advocates Harold Hanson, Sydney Kentridge, and Arthur Chaskalson defended him at the hearing. Vernon Berrange led the defence case and Ismail Mahomed (who later became Chief Justice in the new South Africa) and Denis Kuny acted as Junior Counsel.

== Imprisonment and death ==
Fischer carried on underground activities for almost a year. He was arrested in November 1965, nine months after his return to South Africa and after 290 days underground. In March 1966 he was put on trial for a second time on charges of furthering the aims of communism and conspiracy to overthrow the government. He was found guilty and sentenced to life imprisonment. He was imprisoned in Pretoria Central Prison.

After the revolution, he will be my garden boy.

— Bram Fischer (about General Petrus Johann Coetzee)

In 1974 Denis Goldberg and another prisoner, Marius Schoon, became concerned about Fischer’s health; his hip was giving him pain, his digestion was poor and he looked gaunt and frail. Suspecting that Fischer would not receive the proper care he needed, Goldberg kept a detailed diary of Fischer’s medical care which was subsequently smuggled out of prison. Fischer needed a crutch to walk but a request for one was denied; a broom was found and used instead. In September 1974 he fell and fractured his femur and neck whilst trying to shower, after which it took thirteen days before he was admitted to hospital. When he returned from the hospital Fischer was in a wheelchair, disorientated and unable to look after himself. The hip was found to be cancerous. Goldberg argued, and was eventually allowed, to spend the nights with Fischer in his cell where he tried to make him comfortable. By this time Fischer was so emaciated that Goldberg could easily carry him to the toilet pot.

It was not until December of that year that the authorities had him transferred to a hospital. When news of his illness was publicised, the public lobbied government for his release.

Non-political prisoners rarely served their full term and would be released after serving half or two-thirds of their sentence, but political prisoners were required to serve every day of their sentence. Fischer was allowed to leave the prison shortly before his death and placed under house arrest at his brother's home in Bloemfontein in April 1975. He died a few weeks later.

The prisons department had Fischer's ashes returned to them after the funeral and they have never been located. Anti-apartheid political leaders in Parliament Colin Eglin and Harry Schwarz both called for Fischer's remains to be returned to his family, which was refused.

== Tributes and legacy ==
Nelson Mandela wrote in his 1995 autobiography, Fischer was one of the "bravest and staunchest friends of the freedom struggle that I have ever known." From a prominent Afrikaner family, he gave up a life of privilege, rejected his heritage, and was ostracized by his own people, showing "a level of courage and sacrifice that was in a class by itself."

Fischer had been reluctant to serve as leader of the defence at the Rivonia Trial, since many of the witnesses could implicate him in illegal communist activities. In addition, his handwriting was found on documents from Liliesleaf Farm. His white friends could not understand his reluctance and persuaded him to do so, not knowing his Communist Party membership. As a result, when Lionel Bernstein heard about it, he remarked that "He deserves the Victoria Cross".

In her account of her detention and solitary confinement by the South African Security Branch in 1963, Ruth First writes about being questioned about Fischer, telling her interrogators, "Bram is a friend, a very dear friend of mine, a wonderful man, and – thank God for the reputation of your people that you have at least one saving grace – he's an Afrikaner."

Fischer was awarded the Lenin Peace Prize, in 1967.

He was respected by fellow prisoners in Pretoria Central, and even earned the respect of prison warden Vermeulen, who at his trial following suspected involvement in the prison escape involving Tim Jenkin and others in 1979, called him the nicest prisoner he'd guarded, saying "Fischer was very keen on rugby. We used to talk about it a lot. I felt sorry when he died. He was a gentleman. He was the leader of the prisoners."

One of the first major post apartheid housing projects in Johannesburg was named Bram Fischerville in his honour. It is located north of Soweto, has 22,000 formal houses and was settled from 1997 onwards.

In Country of My Skull (1998), Antjie Krog wrote, "He was so much braver than the rest of us, he paid so much more, his life seems to have touched the lives of so many people – even after his death".

In 2003 Fischer became the first South African ever to be posthumously reinstated to the Bar.

In 2004, despite opposition from alumni and management, Fischer was awarded a posthumous honorary degree by Stellenbosch University.

Rhodes House (University of Oxford), where Fischer was a student, has held an annual Bram Fischer Memorial Lecture to honour his legacy since 2007, a reincarnation of a former lecture in his name hosted by New College.

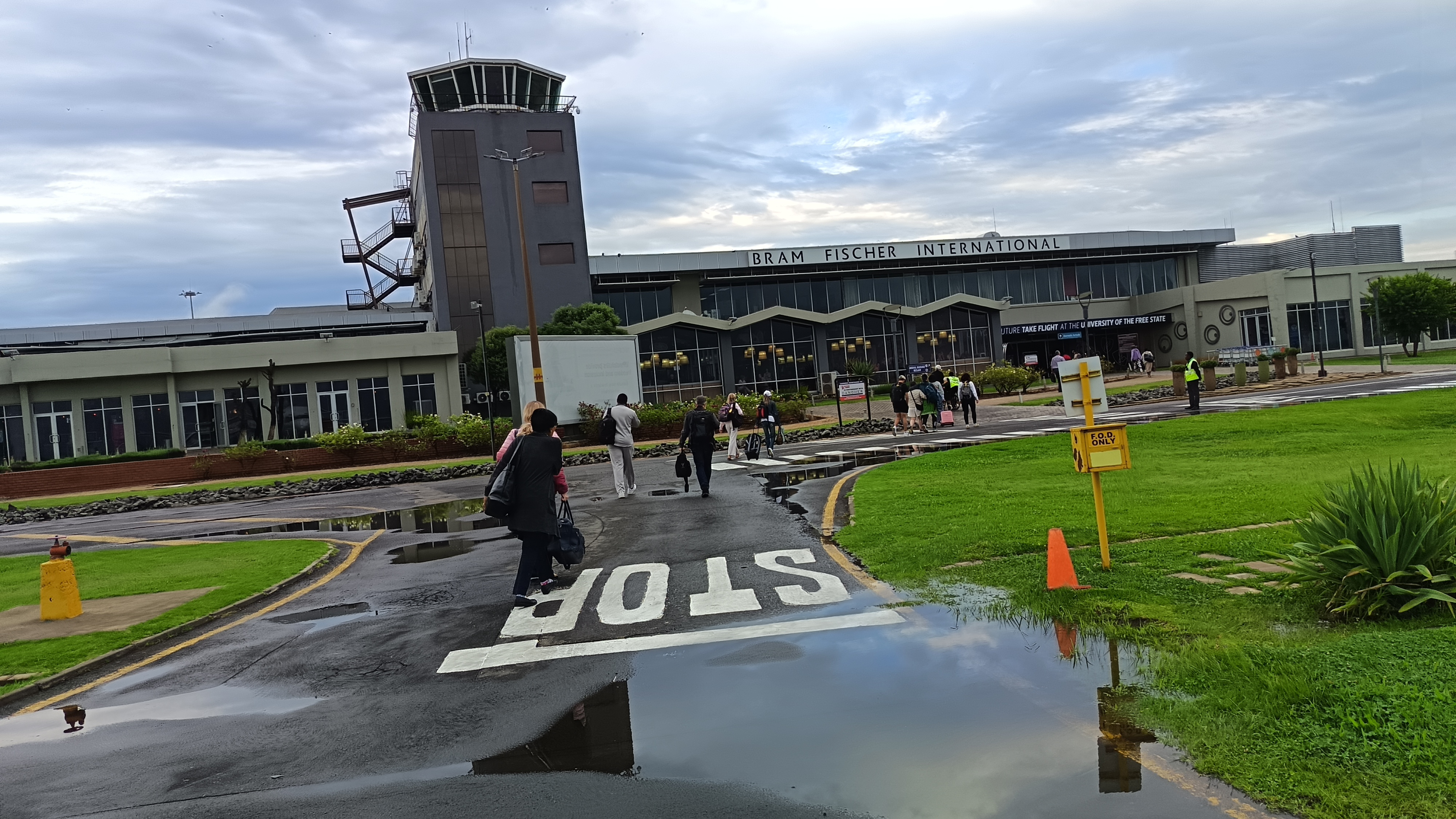
Bram Fischer International Airport, Bloemfontein, South Africa.

In December 2012, Bloemfontein Airport was renamed Bram Fischer International Airport.

== Works about Fischer ==
An early biography was written in Bram Fischer's lifetime by Naomi Michison, A Life for Africa: The Story of Bram Fischer (1973).

Burger's Daughter (1979), a novel by literature Nobel Prize winner and fellow South African, Nadine Gordimer, is based on the life of Bram Fischer's daughter; he is the "Burger" of the title.

Fischer is also the subject of Stephen Clingman's Bram Fischer: Afrikaner Revolutionary, which won the Alan Paton Award in 1999, and Martin Meredith's Fischer's Choice.

South African director Sharon Farr's documentary, Love, Communism, Revolution & Rivonia – Bram Fischer’s Story, won the Encounters Film Festival Audience Award for Best South African Documentary in August 2007.

Harry Kalmer wrote The Braam Fischer Waltz, a play performed by David Butler at the National Arts Festival in Grahamstown in 2013 and 2014.

In 2017 the feature film Bram Fischer (alternative title An Act of Defiance) directed by Jean van de Velde was released in the Netherlands, with the role of Bram Fischer played by Peter Paul Muller.

== Notes and references ==
- Clingman, Stephen (1998). Bram Fischer: Afrikaner Revolutionary. David Philip Publishers. ISBN 978-0-86486-677-6.
- Sisulu, Elinor (2003). Walter & Albertina Sisulu: in our time. Abacus. ISBN 978-0-86486-639-4.
- Mandela, Nelson (1995). Long Walk to Freedom: The Autobiography of Nelson Mandela. Little, Brown. ISBN 978-1-4087-0311-3.
- Krog, Antjie (1998). Country of My Skull: Guilt, Sorrow, and the Limits of Forgiveness in the New South Africa. Three River Press. ISBN 978-0-8129-3129-7.
- First, Ruth (1965). 117 Days: An Account of Confinement And Interrogation Under The South African 90-Day Detention Law. Penguin. ISBN 978-0-7481-1905-9.
- Anon (2007). "Biography of Bram Fischer". zar.co.za. Archived from the original on 18 September 2014.
