= Congress of People =

Congress of People काँग्रेस ऑफ़ पीपल
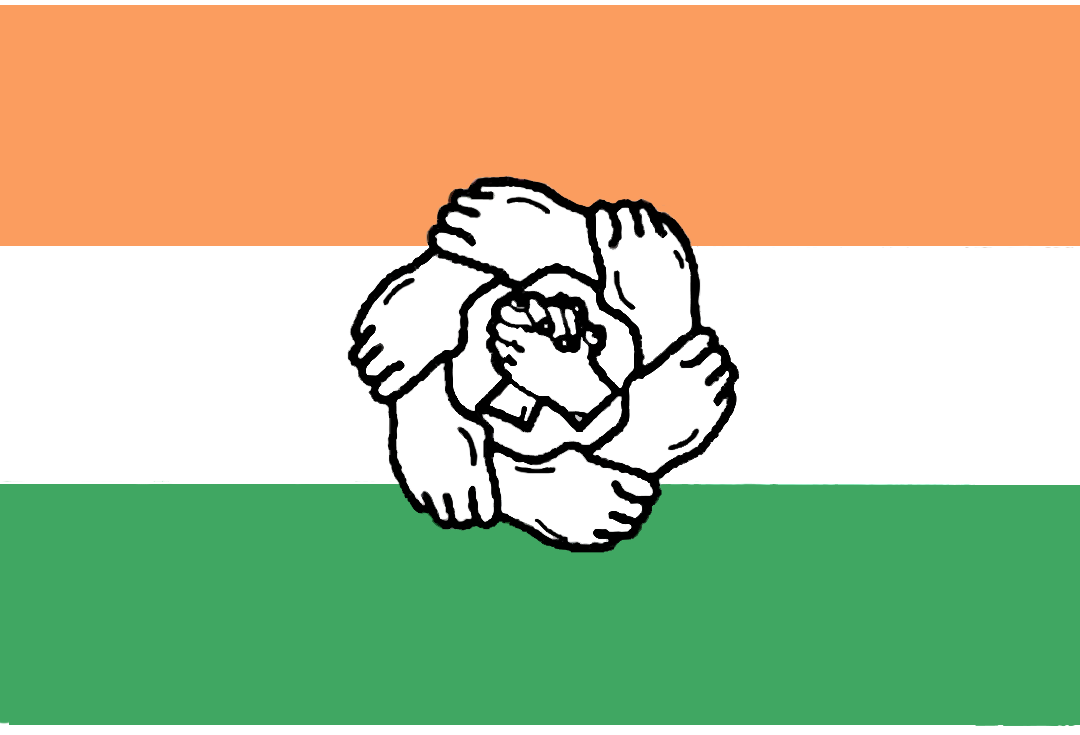
- Abbreviation: COP
- President: Mr. HARIBABU PASWAN
- Founded: 17 May 1993 (31 years ago)
- Headquarters: 23, Dhanushya Society, Sama Road, Baroda, Gujarat, India-390008
- Youth wing: Youth Congress of India
- Colours: Azure
- ECI Status: Unrecognized Party

The Congress of People (COP) is a registered, unrecognised political party in India.

== See also ==
- Politics of India
- List of political parties in India
