= Hilda Bernstein =

British-born author, artist and activist

- Lionel and Hilda Bernstein
- Born: Hilda Schwarz; 15 May 1915; London, United Kingdom
- Died: 8 September 2006 (aged 91); Cape Town, South Africa
- Occupations: author, artist
- Known for: Anti-apartheid activism

Hilda Bernstein OLG (15 May 1915 – 8 September 2006) was a British-born author, artist, and an activist against apartheid and for women's rights.

She was born Hilda Schwarz in London, England, and emigrated to South Africa at the age of 18 years, becoming active in politics. She married fellow activist Lionel "Rusty" Bernstein in March 1941, and together they played prominent roles in the struggle to end apartheid in South Africa. After her husband was tried and acquitted in the Rivonia Trial in 1964, government harassment forced them to flee to Botswana, an ordeal described in her 1967 book The World that was Ours, which was republished by Persephone Books in 2004. They lived in Britain for some years where she further established herself internationally as a speaker, writer, and artist. She returned with her husband to South Africa in 1994 for the South African election in which fellow activist Nelson Mandela was elected President. She died at the age of 91 in Cape Town, South Africa.

== Early life ==
Bernstein was born in London, England, on 15 May 1915 to Russian-Jewish immigrants Simeon and Dora Schwarz. During her education, she attended state schools. In 1925, when she was 10 years old, her father, who was a lifelong Bolshevik and had been the Russian Trade Attaché to Britain, was recalled to the Soviet Union. He was not able to return to Britain, and after his death she quit school to work, before emigrating to South Africa at the age of 18 to work in journalism. After relocating to South Africa, she worked in publishing and journalism, specifically in advertising agencies.

== Activism in South Africa ==
In response to the rise of fascism in Europe, she became involved with the Labour Party. This party, however, did not share her growing concern with apartheid and she left it to join the South African Communist Party, the only South African party with no racial segregation. She demonstrated her speaking and organizing skills on the party's district committee and national executive committee.

Through her political activities she met Lionel "Rusty" Bernstein, whom she married in March 1941. During this time, they taught basic literacy and Marxist theory in night-schools organised by the CPSA. This was part of a period of rapid popularity and growth for the CPSA.

In 1943 she was elected to the city council of Johannesburg by a then all-white electorate, the only member of the Communist Party to do so. She used this position for three years as a platform for publicizing the injustices of racism.

In the 1950s she became more focused on organizing with women. She was a founding member of the multi-racial Federation of South African Women in 1956, and she was one of the organizers of the Women's March to Pretoria. Her writings were appearing regularly in periodicals in South Africa and other nations in Africa and Europe.

As early as 1946 the South African government began its attempts to limit her activities and minimize her political influence. In that year she was convicted of assisting an illegal strike of black mineworkers. In 1953 the government banned her membership in a list of organizations, and in 1958 extended this ban to prohibit her from writing or publishing. In 1960 she was detained during the state of emergency declared after the Sharpeville massacre. She was therefore required to go underground with her political work.

In 1963 her husband Rusty was one of 19 African National Congress (ANC) leaders arrested at Johannesburg suburb of Rivonia. Rusty was acquitted at the Rivonia Trial, but was soon rearrested and released on bail to house arrest. Hilda Bernstein fled from their home as the police were on the way to arrest her. They fled to Botswana, crossing the border on foot.

== Life in exile ==
In exile, the Bernsteins eventually settled in Britain, where they continued to work in support of the African National Congress. She also dedicated her written and oral communication skills to the Anti-Apartheid Movement and the British peace movement. Her writings and speaking engagements were numerous in Europe, the United States, and Canada.

She was the author of six books, including The World That Was Ours (1967), which documented their flight from South Africa. Her 1983 novel, Death is Part of the Process, was made into a BBC television drama. In 1994, she published The Rift - the Exile Experience of South Africans. She also dedicated more time to her art, which appeared in several shows and became part of many public and private collections. Her artwork was also used in many publications for the Anti-Apartheid Movement. These artworks included drawings and paintings which featured in galleries in London, the USA and several African countries.

== Return to South Africa ==
Rusty and Hilda Bernstein returned to South Africa in 1994 to participate in the South African election which was the first democratic election where all races were allowed to vote, and see the end of apartheid and their fellow ANC member Nelson Mandela become president.

In 1998, both Rusty and Hilda were awarded honorary degrees from the University of Natal for their role in helping to bring democracy to South Africa. Rusty died at their home in 2002.

In 2004 she was awarded the Luthuli Silver Award for her "contribution to the attainment of gender equality and a free and democratic society" in South Africa. She died from heart failure at the age of 91 at her home in Cape Town, South Africa. She was survived by their four children: Toni, Patrick, Frances, and Keith Bernstein.

In March 2011, the country of Gambia issued a postage stamp in her honour, naming her as one of the Legendary Heroes of Africa.

== Published works ==
- The World That Was Ours (Persephone Books, 1967. Reissued in 2009, ISBN 978-1-906462-09-3)
- The Terrorism of Torture
- For Their Triumphs and for Their Tears: Women in Apartheid South Africa (Africa Fund, 1985, ISBN 0-904759-58-X)
- Steve Biko (Victor Kamkin, 1978, ISBN 0-904759-21-0)
- No. 46: Steve Biko (Victor Kamkin, 1978, ISBN 0-317-36653-X)
- Death is Part of the Process (Sinclair Browne, 1983, ISBN 0-86300-028-2)
- The Rift: The Exile Experience of South Africans
- A World of One's Own (reprinted as Separation, Corvo Books, ISBN 0-9543255-2-4)
- The Trials of Nelson Mandela

== See also ==
- List of people subject to banning orders under apartheid

== Sources ==
- "Hilda Bernstein, 91, Author and Anti-Apartheid Activist, Dies", Associated Press, The New York Times, 13 September 2006.
- "Hilda Bernstein Obituary", Lionel "Rusty" Bernstein – South African freedom fighter – tribute website, Patrick Bernstein. (Retrieved 13 September 2006)
