= Toon van den Heever =

South African writer

The Honourable Toon van den Heever

Judge of the Appellate Division
- In office 1948–1956

Judge President of the Orange Free State Provincial Division of the Supreme Court of South Africa
- In office 1948–1948
- Preceded by: Percy Fischer
- Succeeded by: E. M. de Beer

Judge of the Orange Free State Provincial Division of the Supreme Court of South Africa
- In office 1938–1948

Judge of the Southwest Africa Division of the Supreme Court of South Africa
- In office 1933–1938

Personal details
- Born: Francois Petrus van den Heever; 29 November 1894 Heidelberg, South African Republic
- Died: 29 January 1956 (aged 61) Bloemfontein, Orange Free State, Union of South Africa
- Other political affiliations: <! --For additional political affiliations-->
- Domestic partner(s): <! --For those with a domestic partner and not married-->
- Children: Leonora van den Heever
- Education: Transvaal University College

Francois Petrus 'Toon' van den Heever (1894–1956) was a Hertzog Prize-winning South African poet, a scholar of Roman-Dutch law, and from 1948 to 1956 a judge of the Appellate Division.

== Early life and education ==
Van den Heever was born near Heidelberg and obtained his BA degree at the Transvaal University College in 1916. After university he taught Latin, Dutch and English for two years, after which he joined the Windhoek civil administration and also studied part-time for his LLB degree.

== Career ==
Van den Heever started practicing as an advocate at the Bar in Windhoek in 1921. He then worked as Senior Law Adviser to the Union Government, the Department of Foreign Affairs and from 1931 as Secretary for Justice, Law Adviser for External Affairs and Government Attorney. In 1933, van den Heever was appointed a judge on the Southwest Africa Division of the Supreme Court of South Africa and in 1938, he relocated to the Orange Free State Provincial Division. In 1948, he became Judge President of the Orange Free State Division and in the same year he was appointed to the Appellate Division, a post he had held until his death in 1956.

== Published works ==
Van den Heever published his debut collection of poems in 1919 and his second bundle only thirty years later. He received the Hertzog Prize for poetry in 1951 for his 1919 debut bundel, Gedigte, that was reworked in 1931 as Eugene en ander gedigte. Besides poetry, he also published sketches, narratives and short stories.

His published works include:

- Gedigte (1919 – Poetry)
- Die speelman van Dorestad (1949 – Poetry)
- Gerwe uit die erfpag van Skoppensboer (1949 – Short stories)
