= Kliptown =

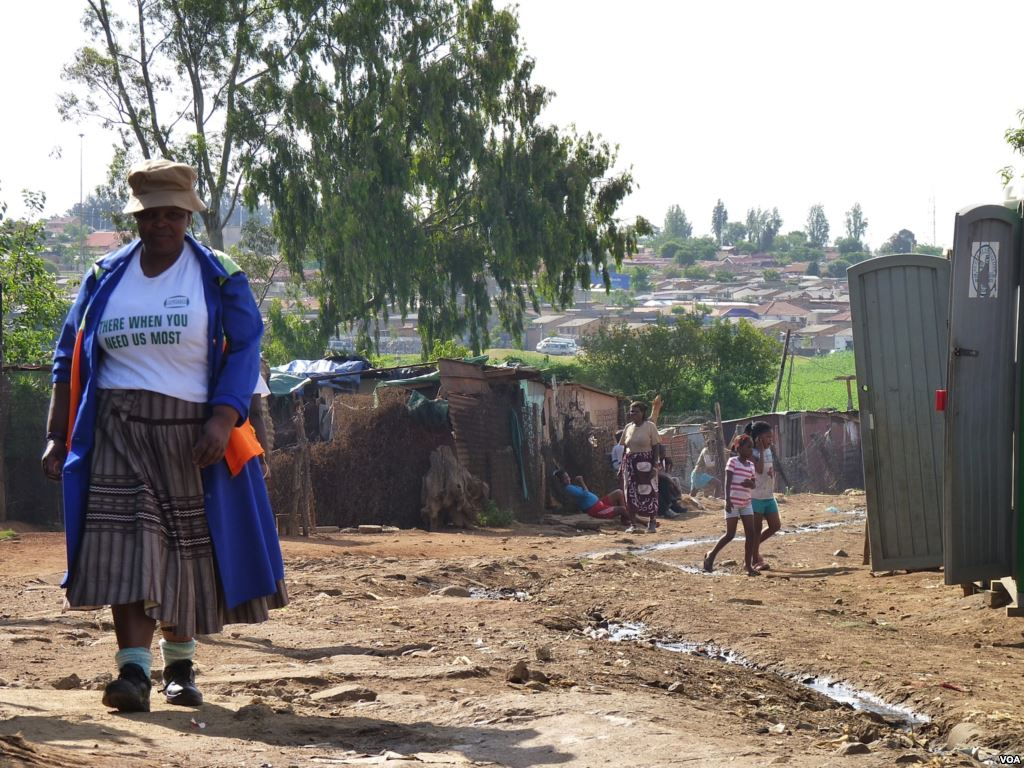
- Kliptown in November 2012

- Location within Gauteng Location within South Africa
- Coordinates: 26.284°S 27.887°E
- Country: South Africa
- Province: Gauteng
- Municipality: City of Johannesburg
- Main Place: Soweto

Area
  - Total: 0.77 km^{2} (0.30 sq mi)

Population (2011)
  - Total: 7,548
  - Density: 9,800/km^{2} (25,000/sq mi)

Racial makeup (2011)
  - Black African: 68.2%
  - Coloured: 30.6%
  - Indian/Asian: 0.8%
  - White: 0.1%
  - Other: 0.4%

First languages (2011)
  - Afrikaans: 32.4%
  - Sotho: 20.5%
  - Zulu: 14.2%
  - Tswana: 6.8%
  - Other: 26.0%
- Time zone: UTC+2 (SAST)
- Postal code (street): 1811
- PO box: 1812

Kliptown is a suburb of the formerly black township of Soweto in Gauteng, South Africa, located about 17 km south-west of Johannesburg. Kliptown is the oldest residential district of Soweto, and was first laid out in 1891 on land which formed part of Klipspruit farm. The farm was named after the klipspruit (rocky stream) that runs nearby. Historically, the area was home to informal settlements (squatter camps). The area now contains a mixture of purpose-built housing and many shacks and other informal homes which form the Chris Hani and Dlamini settlements.

== History ==
From 1903 the area was home to informal settlements (squatter camps).

In June, 1955, Kliptown was the home of an unprecedented Congress of the People, organised by the African National Congress, the South African Indian Congress, the South African Congress of Democrats and the Coloured People's Congress. This Congress saw the declaration and adoption of the Freedom Charter, which set out the aims and aspirations of the opponents of apartheid.

== Economy ==
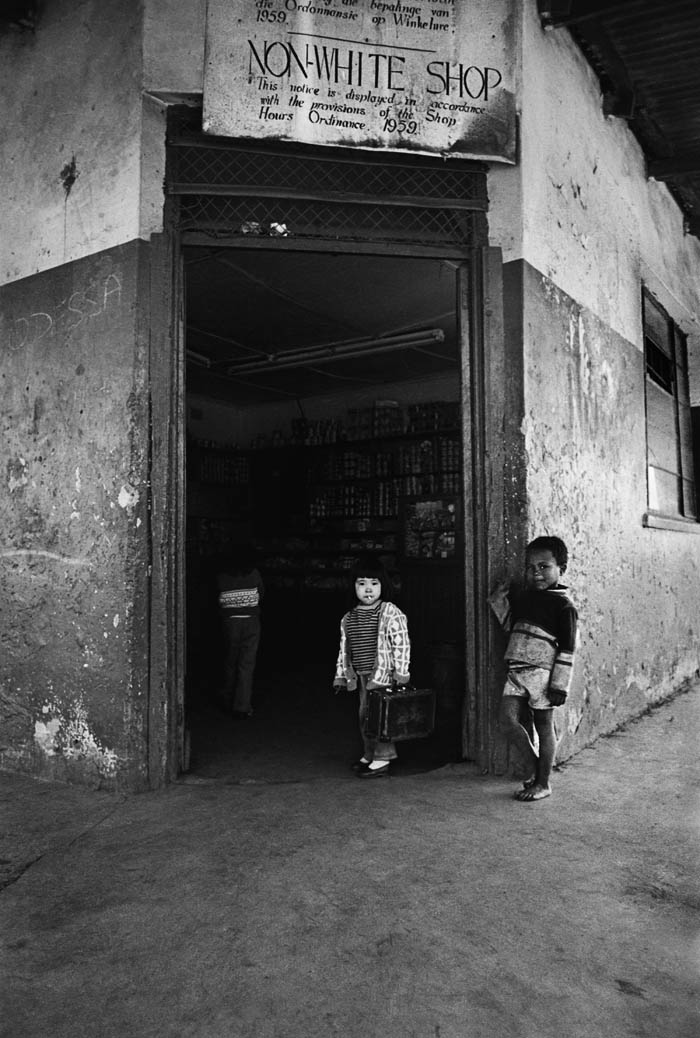
A shop in Kliptown in 1979

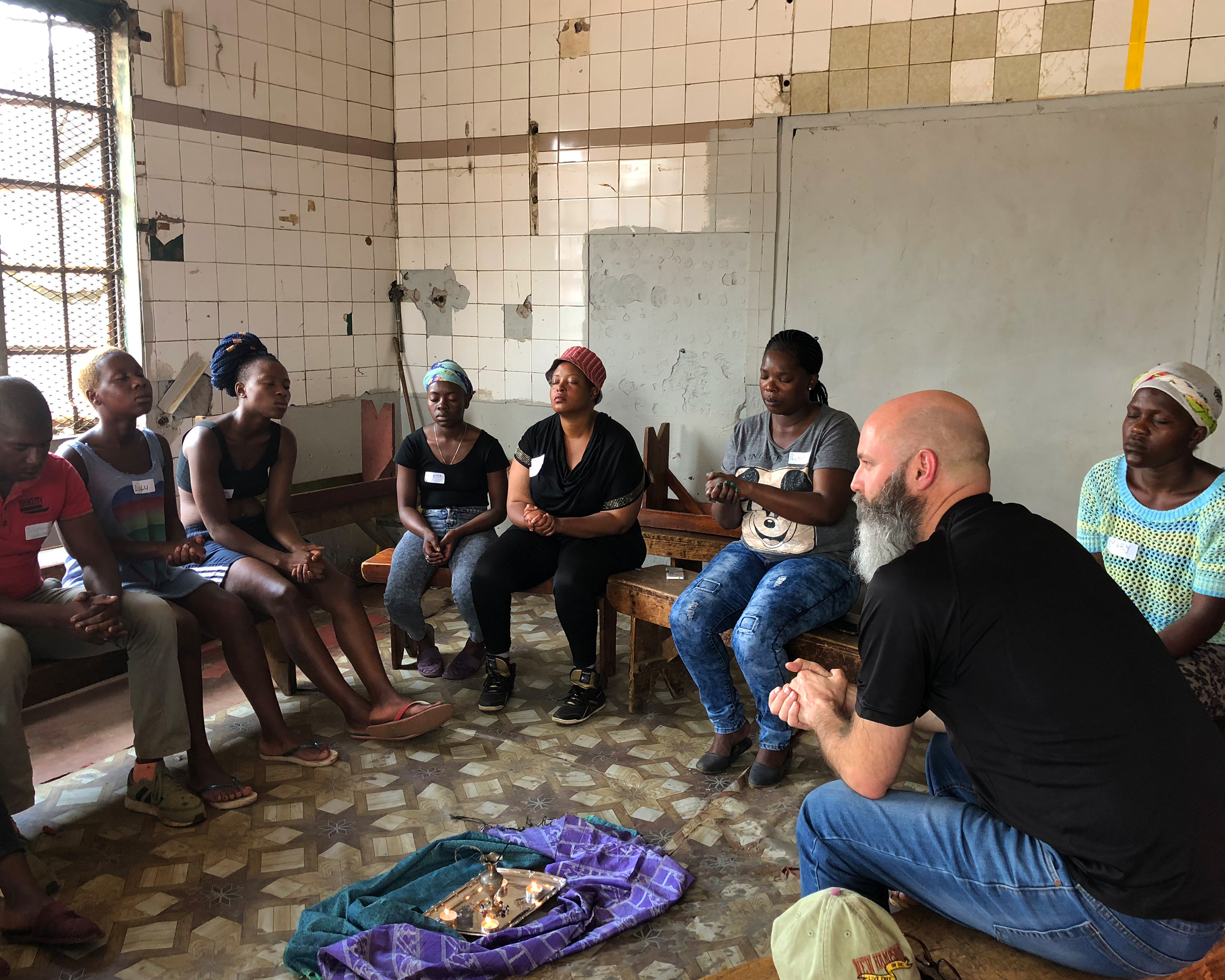
An emotional fitness class using "Shape of Emotion" with unemployed youth from Kliptown

In 2005 Kliptown had an unemployment rate of 72%. In that same year Johannesburg City Council announced plans for renewal of the Kliptown area, including a large-scale housing project.

== In popular culture ==
American DJ and producer Skrillex released the single "Kliptown Empyrean" in 2020. Inspired by his experience working with the Kliptown Youth Program alongside the late rapper Riky Rick, the track heavily incorporates samples created with local residents.

Australian author Irma Gold set her 2025-published novel, Shift, in Kliptown.

== Transport ==
The Metrorail Gauteng service operates to Kliptown Station.

Means of transport in Kliptown.

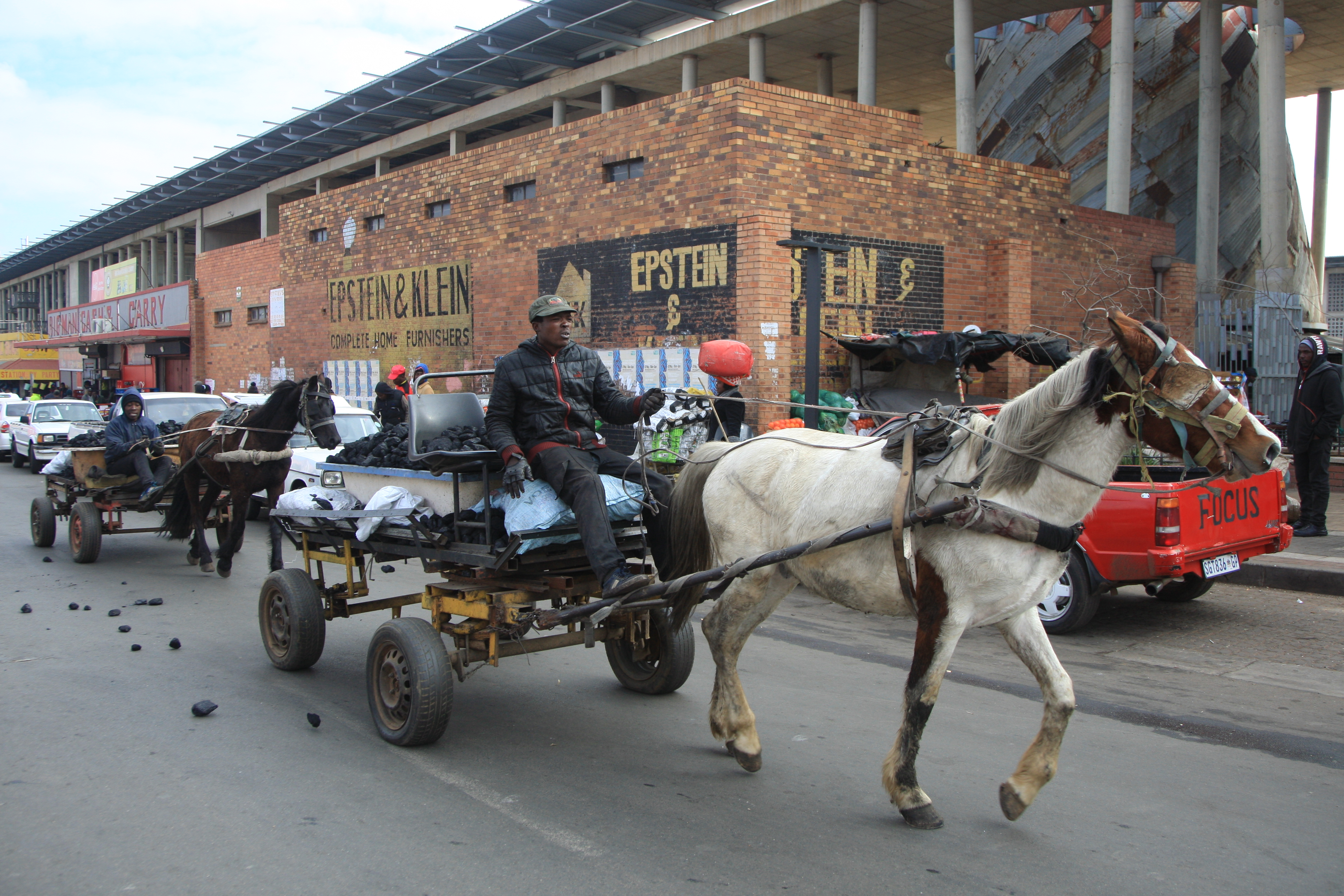

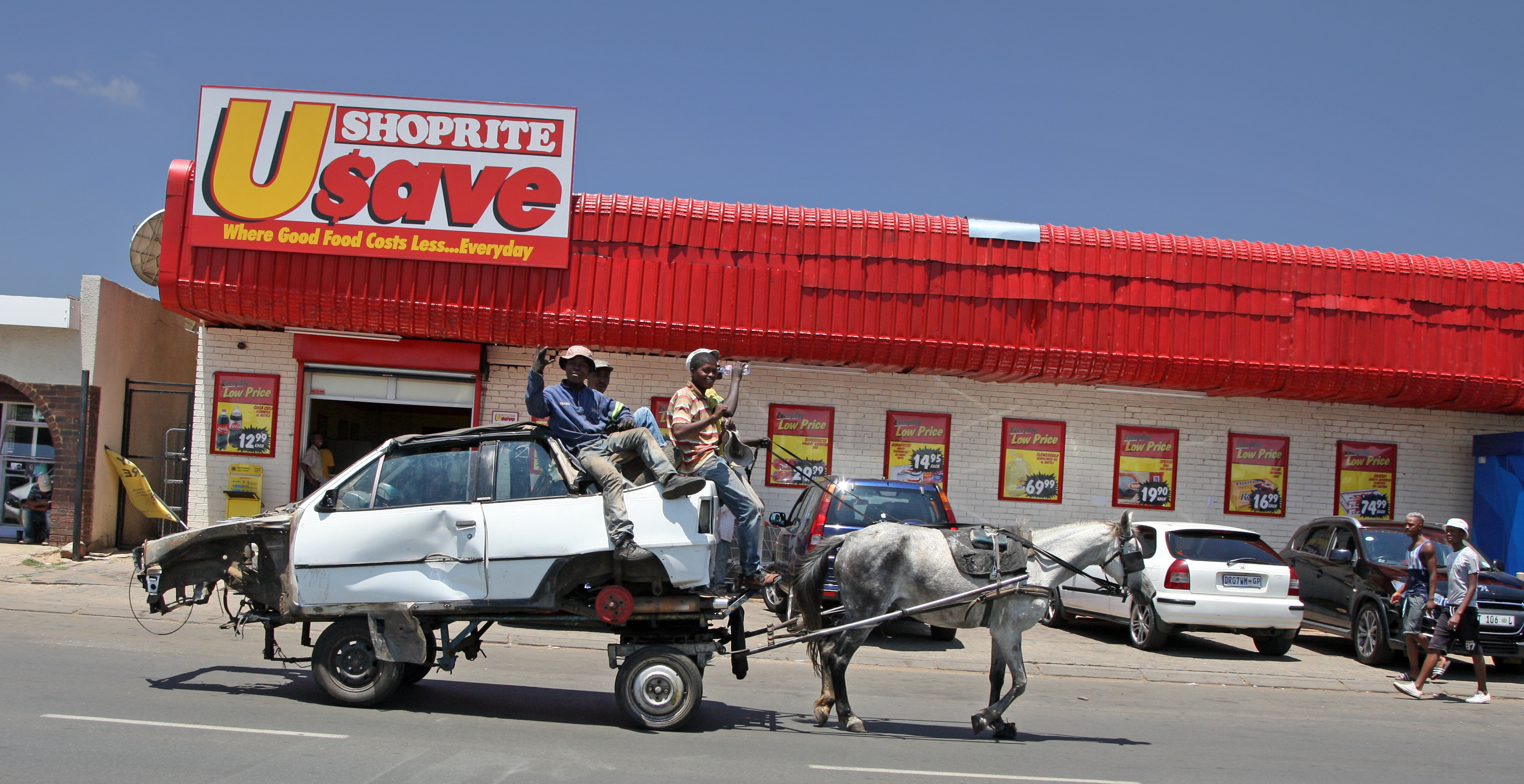

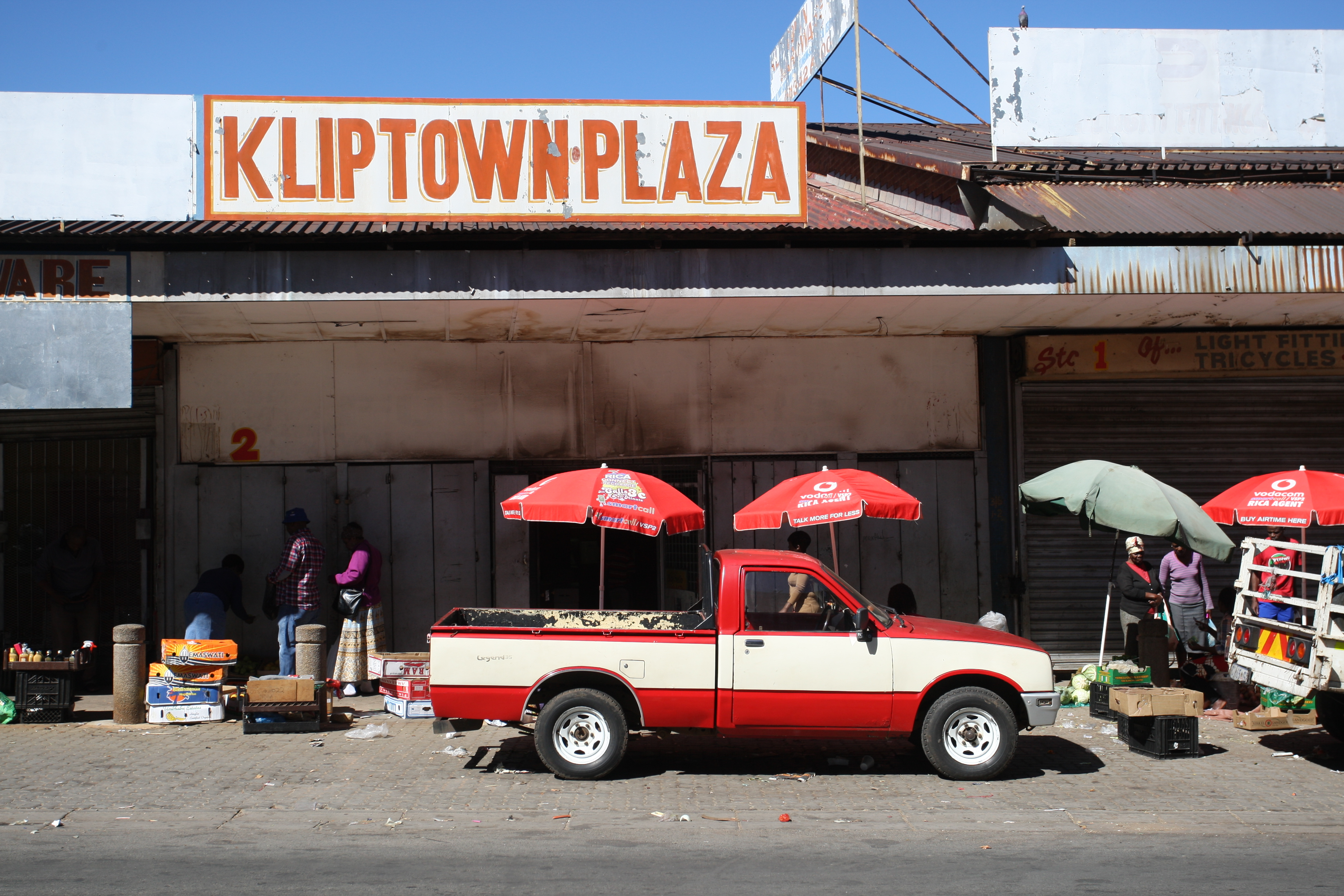

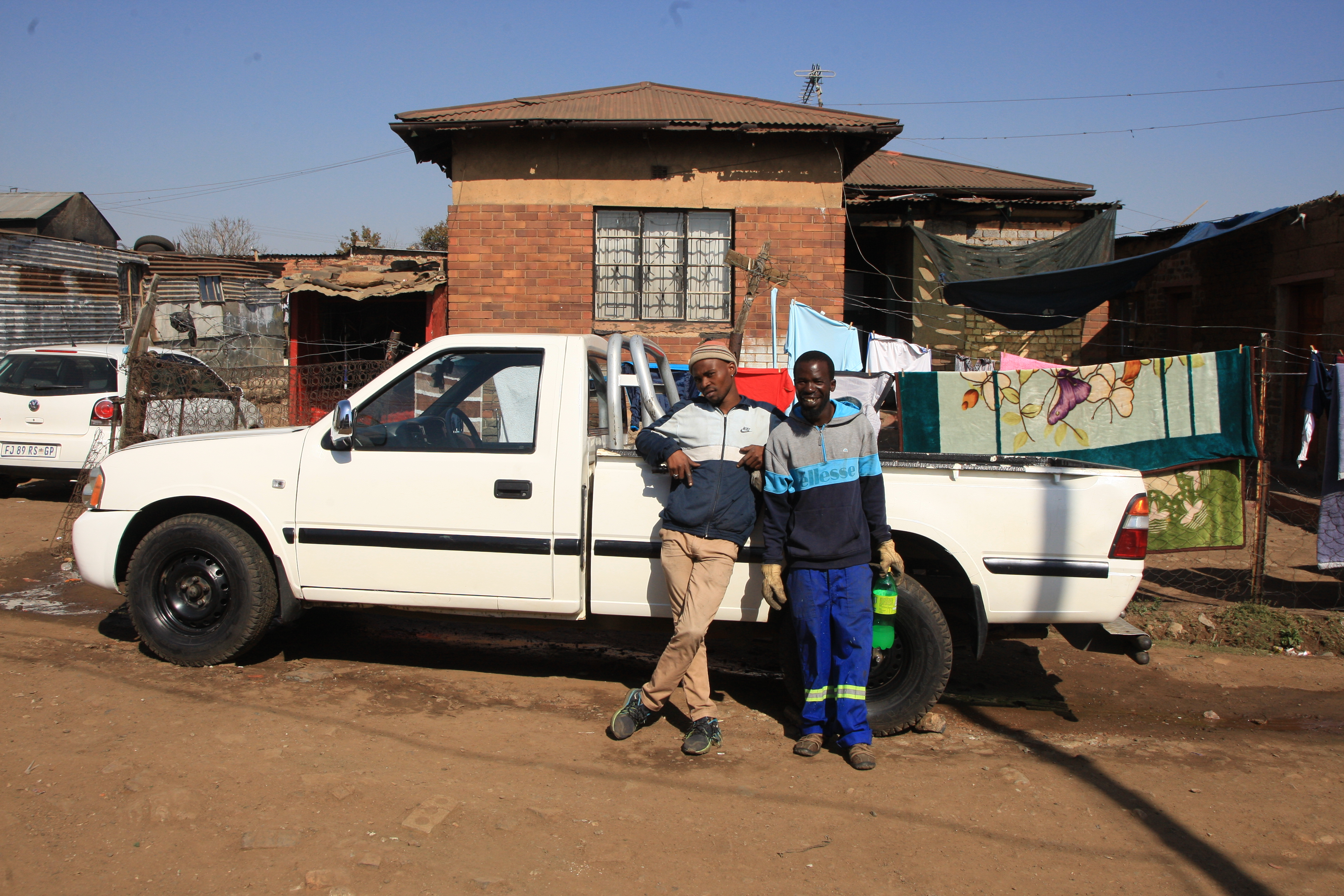

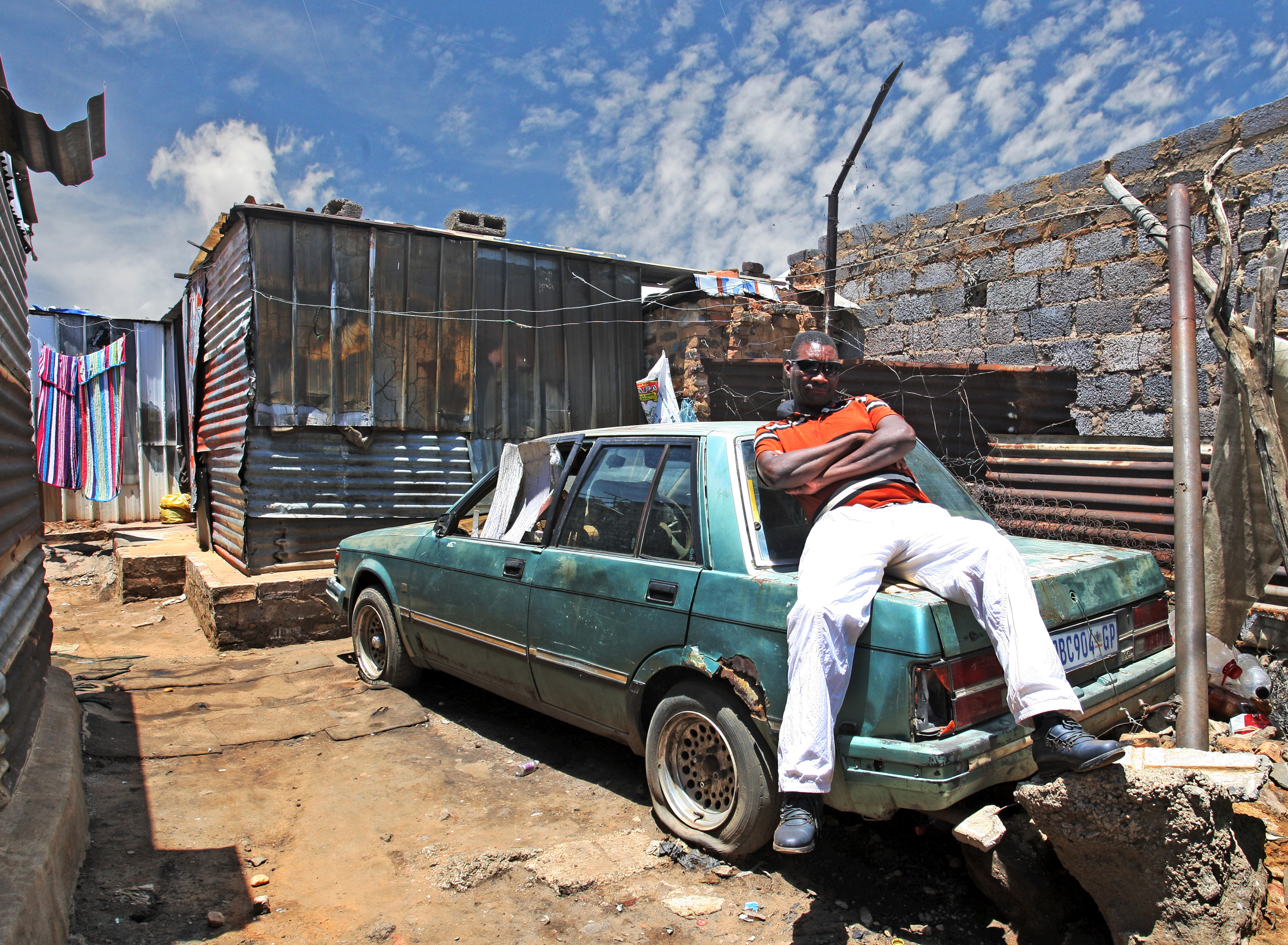

== Sources ==
- Musiker, N. and R., 1999, A Concise Historical Dictionary of Greater Johannesburg, Francolin Publishers, Cape Town, South Africa.
- Johannesburg City Council
- Soweto Kliptown Youth (SKY) Community Center
