= Harold Hanson (lawyer) =

- Born: 9 August 1904; Johannesburg, Transvaal Colony
- Died: 17 February 1973 (aged 68)
- Education: King Edward VII High School
- Alma mater: University of the Witwatersrand
- Occupation: Advocate
- Known for: Rivonia Trial

Harold Joseph Hanson (9 August 1904 – 17 February 1973) was an eminent South African advocate (QC) and Senior Member of the Johannesburg Bar Council.

== Early life ==
Harold Hanson was born in Johannesburg, son of Ralph Hanson, a Rand pioneer, and Clara Lewis. He was educated at Twist Street Government Primary School, Johannesburg, and King Edward VII High School where he passed the Matriculation Exam at the age of fourteen. Hanson studied law at the University of the Witwatersrand and was called to the Bar in 1926 at the age of 22. He subsequently built up a large practice in Johannesburg dealing with civil, criminal, and political cases.

== Legal career ==
Harold Hanson was appointed a KC (later known as QC) in 1946. He appeared for the plaintiff, defendant or accused in a number of the most important and lengthy cases in South African legal history. These included the Alexander libel case, an action for damages for defamation brought by F. M. Alexander, the founder of the Alexander Technique of psycho-physical education, against Drs Jokl, Cluver and Clark (1946–48); The Parity Insurance Company case (State vs. Heller) in which he defended the accused charged with fraud (1968–70) and Gentrico A.G vs. Firestone SA (Pty) Ltd in what has been called the greatest lawsuit in the 500-year history of patents.

He believed strongly in civil liberty and was well known for his support of political defendants, often acting on their behalf without a fee. He is perhaps best known for his contribution to the last day of the Rivonia Trial (12 June 1964) in which he accepted a request from his colleague and friend Bram Fischer to argue mitigation for the accused. Hanson made a political appeal in a trial of politically inspired offences which in effect pleaded for the lives of the accused. He compared the African struggle for civil rights to the early Voortrekker Afrikaner struggle and cited precedents for clemency even in cases of high treason which carried the death penalty. Alan Paton, novelist, national president of the Liberal Party, a devout Christian and opponent of violence was called as the only witness. Ultimately the presiding judge, Justice Quartus de Wet, commuted the death penalty for high treason to life imprisonment. Hanson subsequently acted as counsel for Bram Fischer when he was brought to trial.

E Khan writes: "Hanson was big in every way: in intellect, in physique, in voice, in courage, in application, in determination. He was fearless, if ebullient and temperamental, in court. Ever eloquent — his colleagues would speak of "Hansonian eloquence" — he could develop an argument for his client on fact or law at the drop of a hat. In cross-examination he was penetrating and robust, and could be fierce; he had indeed a great reputation as a cross examiner. To counsel on the other side, he could prove an awkward opponent; but no one ever questioned his integrity".

== Family ==
Hanson first married Mabel Martin with whom he adopted a son, Michael Anthony Hanson and then had a daughter, Clare Hanson. His second marriage was in 1945 to Anna Marie Berger (known as Anita). They had two daughters and a son. Anita predeceased Harold by 18 years, after which he married Cissie Pincus.
