= Duma Nokwe =

South African activist and politician (1927–1978)

11th Secretary-General of the African National Congress
- In office 1958–1969
- President: Albert Luthuli; Oliver Tambo
- Preceded by: Oliver Tambo
- Succeeded by: Alfred Nzo

Personal details
- Born: Philemon Pearce Dumasile Nokwe; 13 May 1927 Evaton, South Africa
- Died: 12 January 1978 (aged 50) Lusaka, Zambia
- Party: African National Congress
- Other political affiliations: South African Communist Party (Tripartite Alliance)
- Education: University of Fort Hare (BSc)
- Occupation: Politician; lawyer; activist
- Nickname: Duma Nokwe

Philemon Pearce Dumasile Nokwe SC OMSG(13 May 1927, Evaton – 12 January 1978), known as Duma Nokwe, was a South African political activist and legislator, and served as the secretary-general of the African National Congress from 1958 to 1969.

== Education and political career ==
He was educated at St. Peter's school in Johannesburg and University of Fort Hare. After graduating with a BSc degree and a diploma in education, he took up a teaching post at Krugersdorp High School.

Active in the ANC Youth League from his university days (he was its secretary from 1953 to 1958) Nokwe was drawn into political action and served a sentence for entering Germiston location without a permit during the 1952 Defiance Campaign. On leaving prison he was summarily dismissed by the Transvaal Education Department. Subsequently, he went as a member of the South African delegation to the 1953 World Youth Festival in Bucharest, and afterwards toured the Soviet Union, China and Britain. On his return to South Africa, he wrote and spoke extensively about his experiences until silenced by a banning and restriction order served on him in July 1954.

Having been effectively barred from the teaching profession, Nokwe moved on to the study of law. When he qualified in 1956, he became the first African barrister to be admitted to the Transvaal Supreme Court, but was effectively prevented from practising his profession by a Native Affairs Department directive. He was debarred from taking chambers with his white colleagues in the centre of Johannesburg and ordered to find an office in an African township. Nokwe contested the order on the grounds that it conflicted with a Supreme Court rule that the offices of a barrister must be within reach of the court, but was by this stage less interested in practising Law than in his political activism.

Along with 155 others, including many prominent ANC members, he was arrested in December 1956 and put on trial for treason. The cases against the majority of the defendants were dismissed by mid 1959. Nokwe, however, was one of 30 whose trial continued under a revised indictment, and he was not acquitted until April 1961.

During this period, Nokwe continued his political work, notwithstanding the trial, banning orders, frequent arrests on trivial charges and on one occasion a violent police assault. He was elected secretary general of the ANC in 1958 at its 46th annual conference in Durban, and went on to oversee a series of campaigns and demonstrations throughout the late 1950s and early 1960s, contributing to the growth of the ANC's mass membership and building its significance as the key organisation in the liberation movement.

During the 1960 state of emergency, he was jailed for five months. After his release, he set about a programme of reorganisation. As one of the leaders of the multi-party committee he helped lay the foundations for the all-in African conference at Maritzburg in 1961, the event that marked Nelson Mandela's reappearance on a public platform after years of banning and restriction.

== Work in exile ==
In the early 1960s, Nokwe was repeatedly arrested and charged; his home was raided and he was placed under house arrest. Facing a long imprisonment under the Unlawful Organizations Act, 1960 for promoting the aims of the banned ANC, Nokwe was directed by the underground leadership to leave the country. He crossed into Bechuanaland in January 1963, together with Moses Kotane.

Duma Nokwe continued to work in exile in the spheres of diplomacy and propaganda, seeking to win for the ANC the recognition and respect of the international community. He spoke regularly at meetings of the OAU and the UN, and at conferences on South Africa called by various anti-apartheid organisations. He was also the voice of the ANC in radio broadcasts from nations friendly to the anti-apartheid cause, and thus continued to reach audiences in South Africa itself.

== Death ==
Nokwe died in Lusaka on 12 January 1978 at the age of 50.
