= Alfred Hutchinson =

Alfred Hutchinson (1924 in Hectorspruit, Transvaal Province, South Africa – 14 October 1972 in Nigeria) was a South African author, teacher and activist.

Hutchinson went to Swedish missionary school, graduated from St Peter's College in Johannesburg and received his BA from the University of Fort Hare. He was classified as coloured by the apartheid government, but saw himself as an African and dismissed the coloureds' struggle to be seen as a distinct people. He worked as a teacher, but was a member of the ANC, and was sacked and jailed for two weeks in 1952 for his struggle against apartheid. In 1956 he was charged with high treason, and fled to Britain via East Africa and Ghana. His autobiography Road to Ghana (1960) is about this experience. In 1964 he published the play The Rain Killers.
