= Congress of the People (1955) =

Meeting of anti-apartheid activists and organisations in South Africa

Coordinates: 26°16′39″S 27°53′20″E

The Congress of the People was a gathering organised by the National Action Council, a multi-racial organisation which later became known as the Congress Alliance, and held in Kliptown on 26 June 1955 to lay out the vision of the South African people. The Freedom Charter was drawn up at the gathering, which was statement of core principles of the Alliance and a symbol of internal resistance against apartheid.

== Background ==
In 1953 prominent black academic Z. K. Matthews proposed that a "Congress of the People" be organised to gather and document the wishes of the people. Organising committees were set up across South Africa. A call was sent out to the people of South Africa by the group later known as the Congress Alliance for proposals for the content of a freedom charter concerning issues such as land, industry, human rights, education, and law. Proposals were received in the form of local demands, in the form of new constitutions, as documents and scraps of papers and these proposals were then developed by a sub-committee into a draft document that could be debated at a future Congress of the People.

On 23 June 1955, executives of the ANC, the South African Indian Congress (SAIC), the South African Congress of Trade Unions (SACTU), the Coloured People's Congress (CPC) and the South African Congress of Democrats (COD) met in Tongaat. This group, who later became known as the Congress Alliance, developed the document known as the Freedom Charter and planned a large multi-racial gathering to be held over two days at Kliptown on 26 June 1955, where it was intended that the Charter be ratified after being read out and discussed.

The draft proposal for the Charter was presented to each delegate when they arrived in Johannesburg for the Congress. The delegates were elected from rural and urban areas, elected by their communities or organisations with funds raised locally to get their representatives to Johannesburg. Where this was not possible, delegates from communities already present in the city were found.

== 26 June 1955 ==
The Congress of the People, consisting of around 3,000 people, gathered in Kliptown, part of Soweto (a large township outside Johannesburg) on 26 June 1955 in a field surrounded by chicken-wire to give it a lawful claim of being a private gathering, so that it was not prevented from assembling by the South African government. The delegates came from all parts of the country, arriving in Johannesburg via car, bus, bicycle, by foot and horseback. The majority of the people in the gathering were black South Africans, with hundreds of Indian South Africans, whites and so-called "Coloureds".

The object of the Congress was to adopt a Freedom Charter representing the aspirations of South Africans of all races. The aim was to have a lead speaker present each section of the proposed charter and to open the section to general discussion and debate by the gathering. This did not happen due to the intervention by the government, and each section was instead agreed to, but not by general discussion. Albert Luthuli, Yusuf Dadoo and Father Trevor Huddleston were all honoured with the ANC's highest honour, Isitwalandwe, but only Huddleston was able to receive his, the other two being subject to banning orders issued by the government. The Congress concluded on 27 June, when the gathering was surrounded by the South African Police and broken up. They made several arrests, confiscated documents and photographed the delegates.

== Ratification of the Charter ==
The last aim of the Congress was to collect a million signatures by 26 June 1956 to acknowledge the creation of the Freedom Charter. A quota of signatures was decided upon with the following required from each province: Transvaal 450,000; Cape Province 350,000; Natal 150,000 and the Orange Free State 50,000. The delegates then returned home to report back to their communities or organisations to spread the adoption of the Freedom Charter.

By the end of 1955, 156 leading Congress Alliance activists were arrested and tried for treason in the 1956 Treason Trial; the Charter itself was used as evidence and eventually declared illegal.

== Significance of the event ==
The Congress of the People led to the Congress movement assuming a fully non-racial character for the first time. From this people's meeting and Charter was born a truly national liberation movement with the aim of a complete social transformation, requiring a radical restructuring of all aspects of South African society.
