= South African Congress of Democrats =

Anti-apartheid organization

Congress of Democrats
- Abbreviation: SACOD; COD
- President: Pieter Beyleveld
- Secretary: Jack Hodgson
- Founded: 1952–53
- Dissolved: 14 September 1962
- Headquarters: Johannesburg and Cape Town, South Africa
- Membership: c. 700
- Ideology: Anti-racism; Anti-Apartheid; Revolutionary Socialism; White–African Alliance
- Political position: Far-left
- National affiliation: Congress Alliance

The South African Congress of Democrats (SACOD) was a radical left-wing white, anti-apartheid organization founded in South Africa in 1952 or 1953 as part of the multi-racial Congress Alliance, after the African National Congress (ANC) invited whites to become part of the Congress Movement.

The establishment of the COD sought to illustrate opposition to apartheid among whites. The COD identified closely with the ANC and advocated racial equality and universal suffrage. Though small, COD was a key organization of the Congress Alliance. The COD took part in every Congress Alliance campaign until it was banned by the South African Apartheid government in September 1962.

== Relationship with the ANC and SACP ==
The ANC viewed the COD as a way to put its views directly to the white public. Moreover, as Nelson Mandela wrote, "The COD served an important symbolic function for Africans; blacks who had come into the struggle because they were anti-white discovered that there were indeed whites of goodwill who treated Africans as equal." Though COD was not itself a communist organization, many members of the banned South African Communist Party (SACP) joined the COD.

== Members ==
COD never had more than 700 members and was based mainly in Johannesburg and Cape Town. Members of COD included:

- Michael Harmel
- Bram Fischer
- Joe Slovo
- Ruth First
- Denis Goldberg
- Albie Sachs
- Baruch Hirson
- Pieter Beyleveld, elected first president
- Ben Turok
- Harold Strachan
- Rusty Bernstein
- Hilda Bernstein
- Arthur Goldreich
- Helen Joseph
- Eve Hall
- Tony Hall

== See also ==
- Springbok Legion
- Torch Commando
