= Apartheid legislation =

South African legislations which were used to enforce apartheid

The system of racial segregation and oppression in South Africa known as apartheid was implemented and enforced by many acts and other laws. This legislation served to institutionalize racial discrimination and the dominance by white people over people of other races. While the bulk of this legislation was enacted after the election of the National Party government in 1948, it was preceded by discriminatory legislation enacted under earlier British and Afrikaner governments. Apartheid is distinguished from segregation in other countries by the systematic way in which it was formalized in law.

== Segregationist legislation before apartheid ==
Although apartheid as a comprehensive legislative project truly began after the National Party came into power in 1948, many of these statutes were preceded by the laws of the previous British and Afrikaner administrations in South Africa's provinces. An early example is the Glen Grey Act, passed in 1894 in Cape Colony, and which diminished the land rights of Africans in scheduled areas.

== List of apartheid segregation in South Africa ==
=== Population registration and segregation ===
- The Population Registration Act, 1950, required that every South African be classified into one of a number of racial "population groups". This act provided the foundation upon which the whole edifice of apartheid would be constructed.
- The Reservation of Separate Amenities Act, 1953 allowed public premises, vehicles and services to be segregated by race, even if equal facilities were not made available to all races.

The Reservation of Separate Amenities Act was repealed by the Discriminatory Legislation regarding Public Amenities Repeal Act, 1990, and the Population Registration Act was repealed by the Population Registration Act Repeal Act, 1991, but the racial classifications remained on the population register until 1992.

=== Job reservation and economic apartheid ===
- Mines and Works Act, 1911
- Native Building Workers Act, 1951
- Native Labour (Settlement of Disputes) Act, 1953
- Industrial Conciliation Act, 1956

=== Segregation in education ===
- Bantu Education Act, 1953
- Extension of University Education Act, 1959
- Coloured Persons Education Act, 1963
- Indians Education Act, 1965

=== Sexual apartheid ===
- The Immorality Act, 1927 forbade extramarital sex between white people and black people.
- The Prohibition of Mixed Marriages Act, 1949 forbade marriages between white people and people of other races.
- The Immorality Amendment Act, 1950 forbade extramarital sex between white people and people of other races.

These laws were repealed by the Immorality and Prohibition of Mixed Marriages Amendment Act, 1985.

=== Land tenure and geographic segregation ===
- The Natives Land Act, 1913 limited land ownership by black people to 8% of the land area of South Africa.
- The Native Trust and Land Act, 1936 expanded this limit to encompass about 13% of the land area of South Africa.
- The Asiatic Land Tenure and Indian Representation Act, 1946 restricted land ownership by Asians in towns and cities.
- The Group Areas Act, 1950 (re-enacted in 1957 and 1966) divided urban areas into "group areas" in which ownership and residence was restricted to certain population groups.
- The Group Areas Development Act, 1955 formed part of the machinery for the implementation of the Group Areas Act.
- The Coloured Persons Communal Reserves Act, 1961 and the Rural Coloured Areas Act, 1963 established "reserve" areas for coloured people in rural areas.
- The Preservation of Coloured Areas Act, Act No 31 of 1961 further entrenched "Coloured Areas" in law and created a legal mechanism to seize land for white Guardians.
- The Aliens Control Act, 1973 loosened the restrictions on residence by Asians in parts of South Africa.

These and other discriminatory acts related to land tenure were repealed by the Abolition of Racially Based Land Measures Act, 1991.

=== Pass laws and influx control ===
- Natives (Urban Areas) Act, 1923
- Natives (Urban Areas) Consolidation Act, 1945
- Prevention of Illegal Squatting Act, 1951
- Native Laws Amendment Act, 1952
- Natives (Abolition of Passes and Co-ordination of Documents) Act, 1952
- Natives Resettlement Act, 1954
- Natives (Prohibition of Interdicts) Act, 1956
- Urban Bantu Councils Act, 1961
- Black Local Authorities Act, 1982

The pass laws were repealed by the Identification Act, 1986 and the influx control laws by the Abolition of Influx Control Act, 1986.

=== Political representation ===
- The South Africa Act 1909, which united the four South African colonies into a unitary state, preserved electoral arrangements unchanged, meaning that qualified black voters in the Cape Province could vote for the House of Assembly. This was an entrenched clause, protected by a provision requiring a two-thirds majority in a joint sitting of Parliament to alter the Cape Qualified Franchise.
- The Representation of Natives Act, 1936, passed with the necessary two-thirds majority, removed black voters in the Cape from the common voters' roll and placed them on a separate roll, allowing them to elect only three members to the House of Assembly. The act also provided for four indirectly elected senators to represent black people countrywide. Qualified coloured voters in the Cape remained on the common roll.
- The Asiatic Land Tenure and Indian Representation Act, 1946 allowed Indians in the Transvaal Province and Natal Province to elect three members of the House of Assembly and two senators, but this representation was removed by the Asiatic Laws Amendment Act, 1948.
- The Separate Representation of Voters Act, 1951 removed coloured voters in the Cape from the common voters' roll and placed them on a separate roll, allowing them to elect only four members to the House of Assembly. It was not, initially, passed with a two-thirds majority, and the Appellate Division of the Supreme Court invalidated it on this basis, precipitating the "coloured vote constitutional crisis". The government subsequently altered the method of election of the Senate and passed the South Africa Act Amendment Act, 1956 with a two-thirds majority, validating the Separate Representation of Voters Act.
- The Promotion of Bantu Self-government Act, 1959 abolished the remaining parliamentary representation for black people under the Representation of Natives Act.
- The Separate Representation of Voters Amendment Act, 1968, abolished the remaining parliamentary representation for coloured people, and the Coloured Persons Representative Council Amendment Act, 1968 replaced it with an elected "Representative Council" with limited powers.
- The Prohibition of Political Interference Act, 1968 prohibited multi-racial political parties.
- The Republic of South Africa Constitution Act, 1983 established a tricameral Parliament with separate houses representing whites, coloureds and Indians. Blacks remained unrepresented.

The Constitution of the Republic of South Africa, 1993 established universal non-racial adult suffrage.

=== Separate development and bantustans ===
- The Native Administration Act, 1927 gave the executive government wide-ranging authority to govern the "native reserves", and the people living in them, by proclamation.
- The Bantu Authorities Act, 1951 established a hierarchy of tribal, regional and territorial authorities, led by chiefs and appointed councillors, to govern the reserves.
- The Promotion of Bantu Self-government Act, 1959 provided for the development of the territorial authorities into self-governing bantustans.
- The Bantu Investment Corporation Act, 1959 established a corporation to develop the economies of the bantustans.
- The Transkei Constitution Act, 1963 made the Transkei an autonomous self-governing territory, with a partially elected assembly.
- The Bantu Homelands Development Corporations Act, 1965 established separate economic development corporations for the various homelands.
- The Bantu Homelands Citizenship Act, 1970 made black people citizens of one of the bantustans, with the intention that when the bantustans became independent they would cease to be South African citizens.
- The Bantu Homelands Constitution Act, 1971 allowed other homelands to become autonomous self-governing territories, similar to the Transkei.
- The Status of the Transkei Act, 1976 declared the Transkei to be an independent state and no longer part of South Africa. This independence was not recognised by any country other than South Africa.
- The Status of Bophuthatswana Act, 1977, the Status of Venda Act, 1979, and the Status of Ciskei Act, 1981, similarly declared Bophuthatswana, Venda and Ciskei to be independent states.

The bantustans were abolished by the Constitution of the Republic of South Africa, 1993, and the nominally independent states were integrated back into South Africa.

=== Banning, detention without trial and state security ===
- Suppression of Communism Act, 1950
- Public Safety Act, 1953
- Riotous Assemblies Act, 1956
- Unlawful Organizations Act, 1960
- Indemnity Act, 1961
- General Law Amendment Act, 1963
- Terrorism Act, 1967
- Indemnity Act, 1977
- Internal Security Act, 1982

== See also ==
- Law of South Africa
- South African Statutes and other Legislation
