= List of acts of the Parliament of South Africa, 1960–1969 =

This is a list of acts of the Parliament of South Africa enacted in the years 1960 to 1969.

South African acts are uniquely identified by the year of passage and an act number within that year. Some acts have gone by more than one short title in the course of their existence; in such cases each title is listed with the years in which it applied.

== 1960 ==
Act no.	Short title
1	South African Road Safety Council Act, 1960
2	Railways and Harbours Acts Amendment Act, 1960
3	Railways and Harbours Unauthorized Expenditure Act, 1960
4	Railways and Harbours Additional Appropriation Act, 1960
5	Births, Marriages and Deaths Registration Amendment Act, 1960
6	Rhodes University Act Amendment (Private) Act, 1960
7	University of Natal (Private) Act, 1960
8	Immigration Amendment Act, 1960
9	Matriculation Exemption Act, 1960
10	Reservation of Separate Amenities Amendment Act, 1960
11	Financial Relations Amendment Act, 1960
12	Precious Stones Amendment Act, 1960
13	Part Appropriation Act, 1960
14	Additional Appropriation Act, 1960
15	National Finance Corporation Amendment Act, 1960
16	Farmers' Assistance Amendment Act, 1960
17	Liquid Fuel and Oil Amendment Act, 1960
18	Companies Amendment Act, 1960
19	Railways and Harbours Appropriation Act, 1960
20	Railway Purchase Act, 1960
21	Railway Construction Act, 1960
22	Railways and Harbours Service Act, 1960
23	Wattle Bark Industry Act, 1960
24	South African Reserve Bank Amendment Act, 1960
25	Unauthorized Expenditure (1958–1959) Act, 1960
26	Weights and Measures Amendment Act, 1960
27	Business Names Act, 1960
28	Land Settlement Amendment Act, 1960
29	Stamp Duties and Fees Amendment Act, 1960
30	Population Registration Amendment Act, 1960
31	Factories, Machinery and Building Work Amendment Act, 1960
32	Extension of University Education Amendment Act, 1960
33	Children's Act, 1960
34	Unlawful Organizations Act, 1960
35	Wool Commission and Wool Amendment Act, 1960
36	Durban Waterworks (Private) Act, 1960
37	Soil Conservation Amendment Act, 1960
38	Cape Town Foreshore Amendment Act, 1960
39	Railways and Harbours Superannuation Fund Act, 1960
40	South African Tourist Corporation Amendment Act, 1960
41	Level Crossings Act, 1960
42	Provincial Powers Extension Act, 1960
43	Railways and Harbours Service Amendment Act, 1960
44	Co-operative Societies Amendment Act, 1960
45	Special Education Amendment Act, 1960
46	Blind Persons Amendment Act, 1960
47	Building Societies Amendment Act, 1960
48	Parliamentary Service and Administrators' Pensions Amendment Act, 1960
49	Broadcasting Amendment Act, 1960
50	Patents Amendment Act, 1960
51	Moratorium Act, 1960
52	Referendum Act, 1960
53	Senate Act, 1960
54	Stamp Duties and Fees Further Amendment Act, 1960
55	Excise Amendment Act, 1960
56	Cinematograph Films Tax Act, 1960
57	Customs Amendment Act, 1960
58	Income Tax Act, 1960
59	Marico-Bosveld Irrigation Scheme Amendment Act, 1960
60	Tobacco and Wine Research Accounts Act, 1960
61	Pension Laws Amendment Act, 1960
62	University College of Fort Hare Transfer Amendment Act, 1960
63	Unemployment Insurance Amendment Act, 1960
64	Finance Act, 1960
65	Estate Duty Amendment Act, 1960
66	Railways and Harbours Second Additional Appropriation Act, 1960
67	Pensions (Supplementary) Act, 1960
68	Appropriation Act, 1960
69	Technological Training Advancement Act, 1960

== 1961 ==
Act no.	Short title
1	Vyfhoek Management Amendment Act, 1961
2	Perishable Agricultural Produce Sales Act, 1961
3	Coloured Persons Communal Reserves Act, 1961
4	Part Appropriation Act, 1961
5	South African Reserve Bank Amendment Act, 1961
6	Banking Amendment Act, 1961
7	Workmen's Compensation Amendment Act, 1961
8	Census Amendment Act, 1961
9	Public Service Amendment Act, 1961
10	Railways and Harbours Additional Appropriation Act, 1961
11	Railways and Harbours Unauthorized Expenditure Act, 1961
12	Defence Amendment Act, 1961
13	Unemployment Insurance Amendment Act, 1961
14	Mental Disorders Amendment Act, 1961
15	Unauthorized Expenditure (1959–1960) Act, 1961
16	General Loans Act, 1961
17	Additional Appropriation Act, 1961
18	Industrial Conciliation Amendment Act, 1961
19	Special Education Amendment Act, 1961
20	Vocational Education Amendment Act, 1961
21	Railways and Harbours Appropriation Act, 1961
22	Dutch Reformed Church in South Africa (Repeal of Laws) (Private) Act, 1961
23	Group Areas Amendment Act, 1961
24	Apostolic Faith Mission of South Africa (Private) Act, 1961
25	Marriage Act, 1961
26	Precious and Base Metals Amendment Act, 1961
27	Anatomy Amendment Act, 1961
28	Seeds Act, 1961
29	Foundation Seed Act, 1961
30	Dairy Industry Act, 1961
31	Preservation of Coloured Areas Act, 1961
32	Republic of South Africa Constitution Act, 1961 (before 1984); Provincial Government Act, 1961 (after 1984)
33	Public Health Amendment Act, 1961
34	Marketing Amendment Act, 1961
35	Land Bank Amendment Act, 1961
36	Companies Amendment Act, 1961
37	Unauthorized Use of Emblems Act, 1961
38	Diplomatic Mission in United Kingdom Service Act, 1961
39	General Law Amendment Act, 1961
40	Kimberley Leasehold Conversion to Freehold Act, 1961
41	Commonwealth Relations (Temporary Provision) Act, 1961
The Republic of South Africa Constitution Act, 1961, came into force on 31 May 1961, and the Union of South Africa became the Republic of South Africa, but the existing Parliament continued without an election.
42	Defence Further Amendment Act, 1961
43	Iron and Steel Industry Amendment Act, 1961
44	Atomic Energy Amendment Act, 1961
45	Interpretation Amendment Act, 1961
46	Universities Amendment Act, 1961
47	Diamond Export Duty Amendment Act, 1961
48	State Land Disposal Act, 1961
49	Post Mortem Examinations and Removal of Human Tissues Amendment Act, 1961
50	Excise Amendment Act, 1961
51	Customs Amendment Act, 1961
52	National Parks Amendment Act, 1961
53	Police Amendment Act, 1961
54	War Special Pensions Amendment Act, 1961
55	Bantu Education Amendment Act, 1961 (before 1978); Black Education Amendment Act, 1961 (after 1978)
56	Water Amendment Act, 1961
57	Railway Construction Act, 1961
58	Payment of Members of Parliament Act, 1961
59	Aliens Amendment Act, 1961
60	Admission of Persons to the Union Regulation Amendment Act, 1961
61	Indemnity Act, 1961
62	Railways and Harbours Acts Amendment Act, 1961
63	Railways and Harbours Second Additional Appropriation Act, 1961
64	South African Citizenship Amendment Act, 1961
65	Pensions (Supplementary) Act, 1961
66	Export Credit Re-insurance Amendment Act, 1961
67	Industrial Development Amendment Act, 1961
68	Public Holidays Amendment Act, 1961
69	Medical, Dental and Pharmacy Amendment Act, 1961
70	Parliamentary Service and Administrators' Pensions Amendment Act, 1961
71	Revenue Laws Amendment Act, 1961
72	Liquor Amendment Act, 1961
73	Appropriation Act, 1961
74	Prohibition of Sports Pools Amendment Act, 1961
75	Welfare Organizations Amendment Act, 1961
76	Finance Act, 1961
77	Building Societies Amendment Act, 1961
78	Pension Laws Amendment Act, 1961
79	Urban Bantu Councils Act, 1961
80	Income Tax Act, 1961
81	Electoral Laws Amendment Act, 1961

== 1962 ==
Act no.	Short title
1	Cannon Island Settlement Management Amendment Act, 1962
2	Douglas Irrigable Areas Board Amendment Act, 1962
3	Births, Marriages and Deaths Registration Amendment Act, 1962
4	Coloured Development Corporation Act, 1962 (before 1980); Development and Finance Corporation Act, 1962 (after 1980)
5	Housing Amendment Act, 1962
6	Archives Act, 1962
7	Land Bank Amendment Act, 1962
8	Perishable Agricultural Produce Sales Amendment Act, 1962
9	Electricity Amendment Act, 1962
10	Iron and Steel Industry Amendment Act, 1962
11	Unit Trusts Control Amendment Act, 1962
12	University of Cape Town Amendment Act, 1962
13	University of Pretoria Amendment Act, 1962
14	Evidence Act, 1962
15	Conventional Penalties Act, 1962
16	Advertising on Roads and Ribbon Development Amendment Act, 1962
17	Part Appropriation Act, 1962
18	Heraldry Act, 1962
19	National Roads and Transport (Co-ordination) Amendment Act, 1962
20	Railways and Harbours Additional Appropriation Act, 1962
21	Statutory Pensions Protection Act, 1962
22	Wool Amendment Act, 1962
23	Wool Commission Amendment Act, 1962
24	National Parks Amendment Act, 1962
25	Additional Appropriation Act, 1962
26	Unauthorized Expenditure (1960–1961) Act, 1962
27	Registration of Pedigree Livestock Amendment Act, 1962
28	Provincial Executive Committees Act, 1962
29	University of the Orange Free State (Private) Act Amendment (Private) Act, 1962
30	Public Accountants' and Auditors' Amendment Act, 1962
31	Inventions Development Act, 1962
32	Scientific Research Council Act, 1962
33	Standards Act, 1962
34	Medical, Dental and Pharmacy Amendment Act, 1962
35	War Special Pensions Act, 1962
36	Railways and Harbours Unauthorized Expenditure Act, 1962
37	Railways and Harbours Appropriation Act, 1962
38	Old Age Pensions Act, 1962
39	Blind Persons Act, 1962
40	War Veterans' Pensions Act, 1962
41	Disability Grants Act, 1962
42	National Parks Act, 1962
43	Deeds Registries Amendment Act, 1962
44	Licences Act, 1962
45	Aviation Amendment Act, 1962
46	Native Laws Amendment Act, 1962 (before 1964); Bantu Laws Amendment Act, 1962 (from 1964 to 1978); Black Laws Amendment Act, 1962 (after 1978)
47	Marketing Amendment Act, 1962
48	Electrical Wiremen and Contractors Amendment Act, 1962
49	Group Areas Amendment Act, 1962
50	Post Office Amendment Act, 1962
51	Radio Amendment Act, 1962
52	Land Survey Amendment Act, 1962
53	Moratorium Act, 1962
54	Admission of Persons to the Union Regulation Amendment Act, 1962
55	South African Citizens in Antarctica Act, 1962
56	Artificial Insemination of Animals Amendment Act, 1962
57	Fencing Amendment Act, 1962
58	Income Tax Act, 1962
59	Stamp Duties Act, 1962
60	Unemployment Insurance Amendment Act, 1962
61	Population Registration Amendment Act, 1962
62	Railways and Harbours Acts Amendment Act, 1962
63	Bantu Beer Act, 1962 (before 1978); Sorghum Beer Act, 1962 (after 1978)
64	Pneumoconiosis Compensation Act, 1962
65	Constitution Amendment Act, 1962
66	War Measures Continuation Amendment Act, 1962
67	Extradition Act, 1962
68	Inspection of Financial Institutions Act, 1962
69	Commonwealth Relations Act, 1962
70	Railways and Harbours Second Additional Appropriation Act, 1962
71	Animals Protection Act, 1962
72	Electoral Laws Amendment Act, 1962
73	Railway Board Act, 1962
74	Aviation Act, 1962
75	University College of Fort Hare Transfer Amendment Act, 1962
76	General Law Amendment Act, 1962
77	Finance Act, 1962
78	Fuel Research Institute and Coal Amendment Act, 1962
79	Explosives Amendment Act, 1962
80	Foreign Courts Evidence Act, 1962
81	Legal Practitioners' Amendment Act, 1962
82	Pensions (Supplementary) Act, 1962
83	Defence Amendment Act, 1962
84	Excise Amendment Act, 1962
85	Customs Amendment Act, 1962
86	National Advisory Education Council Act, 1962
87	Livestock Brands Act, 1962
88	Export Credit Re-insurance Amendment Act, 1962
89	Liquor Amendment Act, 1962
90	Income Tax Amendment Act, 1962
91	Appropriation Act, 1962
92	Pension Laws Amendment Act, 1962
93	General Law Further Amendment Act, 1962

== 1963 ==
Act no.	Short title
1	Cape Town Foreshore Amendment Act, 1963
2	Sea-shore Amendment Act, 1963
3	Financial Relations Amendment Act, 1963
4	Agricultural Produce Export Amendment Act, 1963
5	Natural Oil Amendment Act, 1963
6	Income Tax Amendment Act, 1963
7	Railways and Harbours Acts Amendment Act, 1963
8	Part Appropriation Act, 1963
9	Constitution Amendment Act, 1963
10	Judges' Salaries and Pensions Amendment Act, 1963
11	Women Legal Practitioners Act, 1963
12	Coloured Development Corporation Amendment Act, 1963
13	Railways and Harbours Additional Appropriation Act, 1963
14	Companies Amendment Act, 1963
15	Agricultural Pests Amendment Act, 1963
16	Justices of the Peace and Commissioners of Oaths Act, 1963
17	Additional Appropriation Act, 1963
18	Prohibition of Export of Ostriches Act, 1963
19	Magistrates' Courts Amendment Act, 1963
20	Higher Education Amendment Act, 1963
21	Explosives Amendment Act, 1963
22	Provincial Councils and Executive Committees Act, 1963
23	Maintenance Act, 1963
24	Rural Coloured Areas Act, 1963
25	Moratorium Act, 1963
26	Publications and Entertainments Act, 1963
27	Railways and Harbours Unauthorized Expenditure Act, 1963
28	Railways and Harbours Appropriation Act, 1963
29	Unauthorized Expenditure (1961–1962) Act, 1963
30	Aliens Control Act, 1963
31	Fencing Act, 1963
32	Removal of Restrictions in Townships Amendment Act, 1963
33	Electricity Amendment Act, 1963
34	Factories, Machinery and Building Work Amendment Act, 1963
35	Fuel Research Institute and Coal Act, 1963
36	Land Surveyors' Registration Amendment Act, 1963
37	General Law Amendment Act, 1963
38	Land Bank Amendment Act, 1963
39	Second Railways and Harbours Acts Amendment Act, 1963
40	Merchant Shipping Amendment Act, 1963
41	Associated Institutions Pension Fund Act, 1963
42	Precious Stones Amendment Act, 1963
43	Nuclear Installations (Licensing and Security) Act, 1963
44	Telegraph Messages Protection Act, 1963
45	Import and Export Control Act, 1963
46	Apprenticeship Amendment Act, 1963
47	Coloured Persons Education Act, 1963
48	Transkei Constitution Act, 1963
49	Veterinary Amendment Act, 1963
50	Klipdrift Settlement Amendment Act, 1963
51	Better Administration of Designated Areas Act, 1963
52	Railway Construction Act, 1963
53	Stock Exchanges Control Amendment Act, 1963
54	Financial Relations Further Amendment Act, 1963
55	Slums Amendment Act, 1963
56	Co-operative Societies Amendment Act, 1963
57	Marketing Amendment Act, 1963
58	Second Railway Construction Act, 1963
59	Railways and Harbours Second Additional Appropriation Act, 1963
60	Friendly Societies Amendment Act, 1963
61	Patents Amendment Act, 1963
62	Trade Marks Act, 1963
63	Water Amendment Act, 1963
64	Provincial Executive Committees Act, 1963
65	Unit Trusts Control Amendment Act, 1963
66	Land Settlement Amendment Act, 1963
67	Extension of University Education Amendment Act, 1963
68	Indians Laws Amendment Act, 1963
69	Building Societies Amendment Act, 1963
70	Revenue Laws Amendment Act, 1963
71	Public Service Amendment Act, 1963
72	Income Tax Act, 1963
73	National Film Board Act, 1963
74	Livsetock Improvement Act, 1963
75	Northern Vyfhoek Settlement Adjustment Act, 1963
76	Bantu Laws Amendment Act, 1963 (before 1978); Black Laws Amendment Act, 1963 (after 1978)
77	Defence Amendment Act, 1963
78	Mental Disorders Amendment Act, 1963
79	Public Health Amendment Act, 1963
80	Reciprocal Enforcement of Maintenance Orders Act, 1963
81	Births, Marriages and Deaths Registration Act, 1963
82	Orange Free State Study Bursaries Fund Act, 1963
83	Finance Act, 1963
84	Customs and Excise Amendment Act, 1963
85	Supreme Court Amendment Act, 1963
86	Retreats and Rehabilitation Centres Act, 1963
87	Territorial Waters Act, 1963
88	Liquor Amendment Act, 1963
89	Appropriation Act, 1963
90	Radio Amendment Act, 1963
91	Powers and Privileges of Parliament Act, 1963
92	Criminal Procedure Amendment Act, 1963
93	General Law Further Amendment Act, 1963
94	Pensions (Supplementary) Act, 1963
95	Pension Laws Amendment Act, 1963
96	Parliamentary Service Pensions Amendment Act, 1963

== 1964 ==
Act no.	Short title
1	University of Port Elizabeth Act, 1964
2	Railway Construction Act, 1964
3	Herbert Ainsworth Settlers Trust Amendment Act, 1964
4	Wool Amendment Act, 1964
5	Carriage by Air Amendment Act, 1964
6	Air Services Amendment Act, 1964
7	Companies Amendment Act, 1964
8	Fishing Industry Development Amendment Act, 1964
9	Sea Fisheries Amendment Act, 1964
10	Electricity Amendment Act, 1964
11	Marriage Amendment Act, 1964
12	Archives Amendment Act, 1964
13	University of South Africa Amendment Act, 1964
14	Land Bank Amendment Act, 1964
15	Fuel Research Institute and Coal Amendment Act, 1964
16	Tear-gas Act, 1964
17	Part Appropriation Act, 1964
18	Railways and Harbours Additional Appropriation Act, 1964
19	Financial Relations Amendment Act, 1964
20	Judges' Salaries and Pensions Amendment Act, 1964
21	Workmen's Compensation Amendment Act, 1964
22	Plant Breeders' Rights Act, 1964
23	Residence in the Republic Regulation Act, 1964
24	Bantu Special Education Act, 1964
25	Price Control Act, 1964 (before 1993); Sale and Service Matters Act, 1964 (after 1993)
26	Unauthorized Expenditure (1962–1963) Act, 1964
27	Additional Appropriation Act, 1964
28	Railways and Harbours Appropriation Act, 1964
29	Rand Water Board Statutes (Private) Act Amendment Act, 1964
30	Agricultural Warehouse Amendment Act, 1964
31	Soil Conservation Amendment Act, 1964
32	Weeds Amendment Act, 1964
33	Assistance to Farmers Amendment Act, 1964
34	Bills of Exchange Act, 1964
35	Kopjes Irrigation Settlement Adjustment Act, 1964
36	Olifants River (Oudtshoorn) Act, 1964
37	Agricultural Research Account Act, 1964
38	Vocational Education Amendment Act, 1964
39	South African Tourist Corporation Amendment Act, 1964
40	Jan Kempdorp Act, 1964
41	Extension of Powers of Executive Committees and Administrators Act, 1964
42	Bantu Laws Amendment Act, 1964 (before 1978); Black Laws Amendment Act, 1964 (after 1978)
43	Indians Laws Amendment Act, 1964
44	Weights and Measures Amendment Act, 1964
45	Inventions Development Amendment Act, 1964
46	Mines and Works and Explosives Amendment Act, 1964
47	Rents Amendment Act, 1964
48	Participation Bonds Act, 1964
49	Coloured Persons Representative Council Act, 1964
50	Pneumoconiosis Compensation Amendment Act, 1964
51	Electoral Laws Amendment Act, 1964
52	Industrial Development Amendment Act, 1964
53	Housing Amendment Act, 1964
54	Railways and Harbours Acts Amendment Act, 1964
55	Customs and Excise Amendment Act, 1964
56	Financial Institutions (Investment of Funds) Act, 1964
57	University College of Fort Hare Transfer Amendment Act, 1964
58	Agricultural Produce Export Amendment Act, 1964
59	Fruit Export Amendment Act, 1964
60	Motor Vehicle Insurance Amendment Act, 1964
61	Banking Amendment Act, 1964
62	Building Societies Amendment Act, 1964
63	Attorneys, Notaries and Conveyancers Admission Amendment Act, 1964
64	Police Amendment Act, 1964
65	Co-operative Societies Amendment Act, 1964
66	Marketing Amendment Act, 1964
67	Bantu Labour Act, 1964 (before 1978); Black Labour Act, 1964 (after 1978)
68	Land Settlement Amendment Act, 1964
69	Wine and Spirits Control Amendment Act, 1964
70	Electricity Further Amendment Act, 1964
71	Scientific Research Council Amendment Act, 1964
72	Standards Amendment Act, 1964
73	Precious Stones Act, 1964
74	Admission of Advocates Act, 1964
75	Shops and Offices Act, 1964
76	Finance Act, 1964
77	Revenue Laws Amendment Act, 1964
78	South African Mint and Coinage Act, 1964
79	Appropriation Act, 1964
80	General Law Amendment Act, 1964
81	Defence Amendment Act, 1964
82	Tax Reserve Account Act, 1964
83	Pensions (Supplementary) Act, 1964
84	Pension Laws Amendment Act, 1964
85	Liquor Amendment Act, 1964
86	Natal Divorce Laws Amendment Act, 1964
87	Munitions Production Act, 1964 (before 1968); Armaments Act, 1964 (after 1968)
88	Strategic Mineral Resources Development Act, 1964
89	National Study Loans and Bursaries Act, 1964
90	Income Tax Act, 1964
91	Customs and Excise Act, 1964 (before 2014); Excise Duty Act, 1964 (after 2014)

== 1965 ==
Act no.	Short title
1	First Additional Appropriation Act, 1965
2	University of Cape Town Amendment Act, 1965
3	Provincial Affairs Act, 1965
4	Fuel Research Institute and Coal Amendment Act, 1965
5	Railway Construction Act, 1965
6	Railways and Harbours Acts Amendment Act, 1965
7	Rhodes University (Private) Act Amendment Act, 1965
8	Justices of the Peace and Commissioners of Oaths Amendment Act, 1965
9	Financial Relations Amendment Act, 1965
10	Insurance Amendment Act, 1965
11	Part Appropriation Act, 1965
12	Aviation Amendment Act, 1965
13	Merchant Shipping Amendment Act, 1965
14	Railways and Harbours Additional Appropriation Act, 1965
15	Cape of Good Hope Savings Bank Society Amendment Act, 1965
16	Prevention of Counterfeiting of Currency Act, 1965
17	Perishable Agricultural Produce Sales Amendment Act, 1965
18	Companies Amendment Act, 1965
19	Shipping Board Amendment Act, 1965
20	Explosives Amendment Act, 1965
21	Second Additional Appropriation Act, 1965
22	Unauthorized Expenditure (1963–1964) Act, 1965
23	Banks Act, 1965
24	Building Societies Act, 1965 (before 1986); Mutual Building Societies Act, 1965 (after 1986)
25	Civil Proceedings Evidence Act, 1965
26	Attorneys, Notaries and Conveyancers Admission Amendment Act, 1965
27	Sea Fisheries Amendment Act, 1965
28	Great Fish River Irrigation District Adjustment Amendment Act, 1965
29	Railways and Harbours Appropriation Act, 1965
30	Hire-Purchase Amendment Act, 1965
31	Railways and Harbours Unauthorized Expenditure Act, 1965
32	Cape Town Foreshore Amendment Act, 1965
33	Suid-Afrikaanse Akademie vir Wetenskap en Kuns Amendment Act, 1965
34	Dairy Industry Amendment Act, 1965
35	Census Amendment Act, 1965
36	Statistics Amendment Act, 1965
37	Unemployment Insurance Amendment Act, 1965
38	Public Health Amendment Act, 1965
39	Atomic Energy and Nuclear Installations (Licensing and Security) Amendment Act, 1965
40	University of Port Elizabeth Amendment Act, 1965
41	Wills Amendment Act, 1965
42	Arbitration Act, 1965
43	Universities Amendment Act, 1965
44	Community Development Amendment Act, 1965
45	Atmospheric Pollution Prevention Act, 1965
46	Land Bank Amendment Act, 1965
47	Public Service Amendment Act, 1965
48	Magistrates' Courts Amendment Act, 1965
49	Housing Amendment Act, 1965
50	Children's Amendment Act, 1965
51	Gambling Act, 1965
52	National Roads Amendment Act, 1965
53	South African Road Safety Council Amendment Act, 1965
54	Wine and Spirits Control Amendment Act, 1965
55	Expropriation Act, 1965
56	Group Areas Amendment Act, 1965
57	War Measures Continuation Amendment Act, 1965
58	Financial Relations Further Amendment Act, 1965
59	Correspondence Colleges Act, 1965
60	Marketing Amendment Act, 1965
61	Indians Education Act, 1965
62	Government Service Pensions Act, 1965
63	Copyright Act, 1965
64	Arms and Ammunition Amendment Act, 1965
65	Official Secrets Amendment Act, 1965
66	Administration of Estates Act, 1965
67	Friendly Societies Amendment Act, 1965
68	Public Accountants' and Auditors' Amendment Act, 1965
69	Securities' Transfer Act, 1965
70	Hotels Act, 1965
71	Water Amendment Act, 1965
72	Separate Representation of Voters Amendment Act, 1965
73	Admission of Advocates Amendment Act, 1965
74	Police Amendment Act, 1965
75	Prisons Amendment Act, 1965
76	Judges' Salaries and Pensions Amendment Act, 1965
77	Klipfontein Organic Products Corporation Transfer Act, 1965
78	Marketing, Wool and Wool Commission Amendment Act, 1965 (before 1968); Wool and Wool Commission Amendment Act, 1965 (after 1968)
79	National Welfare Act, 1965
80	Post Office Amendment Act, 1965
81	Revenue Laws Amendment Act, 1965
82	Finance Act, 1965
83	Constitution Amendment Act, 1965
84	Electoral Laws Amendment Act, 1965
85	Parliamentary Service and Administrators' Pensions Act, 1965
86	Bantu Homelands Development Corporations Act, 1965
87	Deeds Registries Amendment Act, 1965
88	Income Tax Act, 1965
89	Industrial Development Amendment Act, 1965
90	National Institute for Metallurgy Act, 1965
91	Mines and Works Amendment Act, 1965
92	Pneumoconiosis Compensation Amendment Act, 1965
93	National Parks Amendment Act, 1965
94	Immovable Property (Removal or Modification of Restrictions) Act, 1965
95	Customs and Excise Amendment Act, 1965
96	Criminal Procedure Amendment Act, 1965
97	Suppression of Communism Amendment Act, 1965
98	General Law Amendment Act, 1965
99	Insolvency Amendment Act, 1965
100	Pensions (Supplementary) Act, 1965
101	Drugs Control Act, 1965 (before 1975); Medicines and Related Substances Control Act, 1965 (from 1975 to 2003); Medicines and Related Substances Act, 1965 (after 2003)
102	Pension Laws Amendment Act, 1965
103	Appropriation Act, 1965

== 1966 ==
Act no.	Short title
1	South-West Africa Constitution Amendment Act, 1966
2	University of Stellenbosch Amendment Act, 1966
3	Community Development Act, 1966
4	Housing Act, 1966
5	Judges' Remuneration and Pensions Amendment Act, 1966
6	Factories, Machinery and Building Work Act, 1966
7	State Attorney Amendment Act, 1966
8	Suppression of Communism Amendment Act, 1966
9	Reciprocal Enforcement of Civil Judgments Act, 1966
10	Kimberley Leasehold Conversion to Freehold Amendment Act, 1966
11	Water Amendment Act, 1966
12	Base Minerals Amendment Act, 1966
13	Matrimonial Affairs Amendment Act, 1966
14	Motor Vehicle Insurance Amendment Act, 1966
15	Motor Carrier Transportation Amendment Act, 1966
16	Advertising on Roads and Ribbon Development Amendment Act, 1966
17	Railway Construction Act, 1966
18	Railways and Harbours Acts Amendment Act, 1966
19	Railways and Harbours Additional Appropriation Act, 1966
20	Railways and Harbours Part Appropriation Act, 1966
21	South African Mint and Coinage Amendment Act, 1966
22	Unauthorized Expenditure (1964–1965) Act, 1966
23	Finance Act, 1966
24	Additional Appropriation Act, 1966
25	Part Appropriation Act, 1966
26	Pension Laws Amendment Act, 1966
27	Railways and Harbours Unauthorized Expenditure Act, 1966
28	Agricultural Credit Act, 1966
29	Electoral Laws Amendment Act, 1966
30	Unemployment Insurance Act, 1966
31	Perishable Agricultural Produce Sales Amendment Act, 1966
32	Land Tenure Act, 1966
33	Railways and Harbours Appropriation Act, 1966
34	Separate Representation of Voters Amendment Act, 1966
35	State-aided Institutions Amendment Act, 1966
36	Group Areas Act, 1966
37	Constitution Amendment Act, 1966
38	Further Part Appropriation Act, 1966
39	Civil Defence Act, 1966
40	South African Mint and Coinage Further Amendment Act, 1966
41	Insurance Amendment Act, 1966
42	Government non-White Employees Pensions Act, 1966
43	Industrial Conciliation Amendment Act, 1966
44	Bethelsdorp Settlement Amendment Act, 1966
45	Industrial Development Amendment Act, 1966
46	Motor Vehicle Insurance Further Amendment Act, 1966
47	South African Road Safety Council Amendment Act, 1966
48	Payment of Members of Parliament Amendment Act, 1966
49	Potchefstroomse Universiteit vir Christelike Hoër Onderwys Amendment Act, 1966
50	Wine, Spirits and Vinegar Amendment Act, 1966
51	Rand Afrikaans University Act, 1966
52	South African Mutual Life Assurance Society (Private) Act, 1966
53	Roodepoort and Weltevreden Agricultural Settlements Adjustment Act, 1966
54	Rents Amendment Act, 1966
55	Income Tax Act, 1966
56	Revenue Laws Amendment Act, 1966
57	Customs and Excise Amendment Act, 1966
58	Second Finance Act, 1966
59	Appropriation Act, 1966
60	Pensions (Supplementary) Act, 1966
61	Industrial Conciliation Further Amendment Act, 1966
62	General Law Amendment Act, 1966
63	Bantu Laws Amendment Act, 1966 (before 1978); Black Laws Amendment Act, 1966 (after 1978)

== 1967 ==
Act no.	Short title
1	Registration of Pedigree Livestock Amendment Act, 1967
2	Dessinian Collection Act, 1967
3	Protection of Names, Uniforms and Badges Amendment Act, 1967
4	Livestock and Produce Sales Amendment Act, 1967
5	National Parks Amendment Act, 1967
6	Wild Birds Protection and Export Prohibition Laws Repeal Act, 1967
7	Aliens Amendment Act, 1967
8	Magistrates' Courts Amendment Act, 1967
9	Constitution Amendment Act, 1967
10	Standards Amendment Act, 1967
11	Performers' Protection Act, 1967
12	Explosives Amendment Act, 1967
13	Monuments Amendment Act, 1967
14	Agricultural Pests Amendment Act, 1967
15	Soil Conservation Amendment Act, 1967
16	Mining Titles Registration Act, 1967
17	Births, Marriages and Deaths Registration Amendment Act, 1967
18	Animal Diseases and Parasites Amendment Act, 1967
19	Maintenance Amendment Act, 1967
20	Mining Rights Act, 1967
21	Justices of the Peace and Commissioners of Oaths Amendment Act, 1967
22	Motor Carrier Transportation Amendment Act, 1967
23	Railways and Harbours Acts Amendment Act, 1967
24	Suppression of Communism Amendment Act, 1967
25	War Measures Continuation Amendment Act, 1967
26	Wool and Wool Commission Amendment Act, 1967
27	Unemployment Insurance Amendment Act, 1967
28	Railways and Harbours Additional Appropriation Act, 1967
29	Part Appropriation Act, 1967
30	Marketing Amendment Act, 1967
31	University of Port Elizabeth Amendment Act, 1967
32	Adulterated Leather Laws Repeal Act, 1967
33	Seeds Amendment Act, 1967
34	War Graves Act, 1967
35	Unauthorized Expenditure (1965–1966) Act, 1967
36	Additional Appropriation Act, 1967
37	Indecent or Obscene Photographic Matter Act, 1967
38	Foreign Affairs Special Account Act, 1967
39	National Education Policy Act, 1967 (before 1991); Education Policy Act, 1967 (after 1991)
40	Advanced Technical Education Act, 1967 (before 1983); Technikons (National Education) Act, 1967 (from 1983 to 1988); Technikons Act, 1967 (after 1988)
41	Educational Services Act, 1967
42	Community Development Amendment Act, 1967
43	Slums Amendment Act, 1967
44	Wattle Bark Industry Amendment Act, 1967
45	Financial Relations Amendment Act, 1967
46	Training Centres for Coloured Cadets Act, 1967
47	Housing Amendment Act, 1967
48	Poor Relief and Charitable Institutions Ordinance, 1919 (Cape) Amendment Act, 1967
49	Railways and Harbours Unauthorized Expenditure Act, 1967
50	Railways and Harbours Appropriation Act, 1967
51	University of Cape Town Amendment Act, 1967
52	University of Pretoria Amendment Act, 1967
53	University of South Africa Amendment Act, 1967
54	Patents Amendment Act, 1967
55	Merchandise Marks Amendment Act, 1967
56	Copyright Amendment Act, 1967
57	Designs Act, 1967
58	Workmen's Compensation Amendment Act, 1967
59	Wool Act, 1967
60	Indians Education Amendment Act, 1967
61	Border Control Act, 1967
62	Powers and Privileges of Parliament Amendment Act, 1967
63	Public Service Amendment Act, 1967
64	Population Registration Amendment Act, 1967
65	Iron and Steel Industry Amendment Act, 1967
66	Separate Representation of Voters Amendment Act, 1967
67	Attorneys, Notaries and Conveyancers Admission Amendment Act, 1967
68	Immorality Amendment Act, 1967
69	Civil Defence Amendment Act, 1967
70	Forest Amendment Act, 1967
71	Vaal River Development Scheme Amendment Act, 1967
72	Medical Schemes Act, 1967
73	Mafeking Waterworks (Private) Amendment Act, 1967
74	Police Amendment Act, 1967
75	Rural Coloured Areas Amendment Act, 1967
76	Coloured Persons Education Amendment Act, 1967
77	Factories, Machinery and Building Work Amendment Act, 1967
78	Pre-Union Statute Law Revision Act, 1967
79	Water Amendment Act, 1967
80	Price Control Amendment Act, 1967
81	Aged Persions Act, 1967
82	War Pensions Act, 1967
83	Terrorism Act, 1967
84	Removal of Restrictions Act, 1967
85	Defence Amendment Act, 1967
86	Abattoir Commission Act, 1967
87	Animal Slaughter, Meat and Animal Products Hygiene Act, 1967
88	Physical Planning and Utilization of Resources Act, 1967 (before 1975); Environment Planning Act, 1967 (from 1975 to 1981); Physical Planning Act, 1967 (after 1981)
89	Nuclear Installations (Licensing and Security) Amendment Act, 1967
90	Atomic Energy Act, 1967
91	Pension Laws Amendment Act, 1967
92	Parliamentary Service and Administrators' Pensions Amendment Act, 1967
93	Pensions (Supplementary) Act, 1967
94	Revenue Laws Amendment Act, 1967
95	Income Tax Act, 1967
96	Customs and Excise Amendment Act, 1967
97	Companies Amendment Act, 1967
98	Participation Bonds Amendment Act, 1967
99	Financial Institutions Amendment Act, 1967
100	Canned Fruit Export Marketing Act, 1967
101	Transkei Constitution Amendment Act, 1967
102	General Law Amendment Act, 1967
103	Finance Act, 1967
104	Industrial Conciliation Amendment Act, 1967
105	Appropriation Act, 1967

== 1968 ==
Act no.	Short title
1	Railways and Harbours Additional Appropriation Act, 1968
2	Electoral Laws Amendment Act, 1968
3	Prize Jurisdiction Act, 1968
4	Electricity Amendment Act, 1968
5	Land Bank Amendment Act, 1968
6	Public Debt Commissioners Amendment Act, 1968
7	Financial Relations Amendment Act, 1968
8	Railways and Harbours Acts Amendment Act, 1968
9	Criminal Procedure Amendment Act, 1968
10	Unauthorized Expenditure (1966–1967) Act, 1968
11	Part Appropriation Act, 1968
12	Indians Advanced Technical Education Act, 1968
13	Additional Appropriation Act, 1968
14	Railways and Harbours Unauthorized Expenditure Act, 1968
15	Cape Pensions Laws Revision Act, 1968
16	Slums Amendment Act, 1968
17	Public Service Amendment Act, 1968
18	Births, Marriages and Deaths Registration Amendment Act, 1968
19	Marriage Amendment Act, 1968
20	Wine and Spirits Control Amendment Act, 1968
21	Prohibition of Mixed Marriages Amendment Act, 1968
22	Suid-Afrikaanse Akademie vir Wetenskap en Kuns Amendment Act, 1968
23	Human Sciences Research Act, 1968
24	Universities Amendment Act, 1968
25	War Veterans' Pensions Act, 1968
26	Blind Persons Act, 1968
27	Disability Grants Act, 1968
28	State Land Disposal Amendment Act, 1968
29	Drugs Control Amendment Act, 1968
30	Wine, Other Fermented Beverages and Spirits Amendment Act, 1968
31	South African Indian Council Act, 1968
32	University of the Witwatersrand, Johannesburg, (Private) Amendment Act, 1968
33	Cape of Good Hope Savings Bank Society Act, 1968 (before 1988); Cape of Good Hope Society Act, 1968 (after 1988)
34	Waterval River (Lydenburg) Act, 1968
35	War Graves Amendment Act, 1968
36	Transkei Constitution Amendment Act, 1968
37	Railways and Harbours Appropriation Act, 1968
38	Railway Construction Act, 1968
39	South-West Africa Constitution Act, 1968
40	Census Amendment Act, 1968
41	Statistics Amendment Act, 1968
42	Mines and Works Amendment Act, 1968
43	Expropriation Amendment Act, 1968
44	Pre-Union Statute Law Revision Act, 1968
45	Agricultural Credit Amendment Act, 1968
46	Promotion of the Economic Development of Bantu Homelands Act, 1968 (before 1978); Promotion of the Economic Development of Black States Act, 1968 (from 1978 to 1980); Promotion of the Economic Development of National States Act, 1968 (after 1980)
47	Livestock and Produce Sales Amendment Act, 1968
48	Judges' Remuneration and Pensions Amendment Act, 1968
49	Payment of Members of Parliament Amendment Act, 1968
50	Separate Representation of Voters Amendment Act, 1968
51	Prohibition of Political Interference Act, 1968 (before 1985); Prohibition of Foreign Financing of Political Parties Act, 1968 (after 1985)
52	Coloured Persons Representative Council Amendment Act, 1968
53	Factories, Machinery and Building Work Amendment Act, 1968
54	Development of Self-government for Native Nations in South-West Africa Act, 1968
55	Parliamentary Service and Administrators' Pensions Amendment Act, 1968
56	Bantu Laws Amendment Act, 1968 (before 1978); Black Laws Amendment Act, 1968 (after 1978)
57	Armaments Development and Production Act, 1968
58	Community Development Amendment Act, 1968
59	Marketing Act, 1968
60	Second Railways and Harbours Acts Amendment Act, 1968
61	Standards Amendment Act, 1968
62	Companies Amendment Act, 1968
63	Armaments Amendment Act, 1968
64	Building Societies Amendment Act, 1968
65	Financial Institutions Amendment Act, 1968
66	Transvaal and Natal Societies of Chartered Accountants Act, 1968
67	Post Office Re-adjustment Act, 1968
68	Economic Co-operation Promotion Loan Fund Act, 1968
69	Financial Relations Further Amendment Act, 1968
70	General Law Amendment Act, 1968
71	Dangerous Weapons Act, 1968
72	Forest Act, 1968
73	Limitation and Disclosure of Finance Charges Act, 1968 (before 1986); Usury Act, 1968 (after 1986)
74	War Measures Continuation Amendment Act, 1968
75	Estate Duty Amendment Act, 1968
76	Income Tax Act, 1968
77	Stamp Duties Act, 1968
78	Finance Act, 1968
79	Pension Laws Amendment Act, 1968
80	Housing Amendment Act, 1968
81	Professional Engineers' Act, 1968
82	Gold Mines Assistance Act, 1968
83	Pneumoconiosis Compensation Amendment Act, 1968
84	Pensions (Supplementary) Act, 1968
85	Customs and Excise Amendment Act, 1968
86	State Tender Board and State Procurement Board Act, 1968 (before 1971); State Tender Board Act, 1968 (after 1971)
87	Unemployment Insurance Amendment Act, 1968
88	Appropriation Act, 1968

== 1969 ==
Act no.	Short title
1	Dairy Industry Amendment Act, 1969
2	Public Debt Commissioners Act, 1969
3	Defence Amendment Act, 1969
4	Moratorium Amendment Act, 1969
5	Civil Defence Amendment Act, 1969
6	Railways and Harbours Additional Appropriation Act, 1969
7	National Film Board Amendment Act, 1969
8	War Graves Amendment Act, 1969
9	Assessment of Damages Act, 1969
10	Financial Relations Amendment Act, 1969
11	Unauthorized Expenditure (1967–1968) Act, 1969
12	Additional Appropriation Act, 1969
13	Public Health Amendment Act, 1969
14	Provincial and the Territory Service Pension Act, 1969
15	Establishment of the Northern Cape Division of the Supreme Court of South Africa Act, 1969
16	Prohibition of Disguises Act, 1969
17	Magistrates' Courts Amendment Act, 1969
18	Formalities in respect of Leases of Land Act, 1969
19	South African Medical Research Council Act, 1969
20	Part Appropriation Act, 1969
21	Scientific Research Council Amendment Act, 1969
22	Legal Aid Act, 1969
23	Liquor Amendment Act, 1969
24	Educational Services Amendment Act, 1969
25	South-West Africa Affairs Act, 1969
26	South Africa Act Amendment Act, 1969
27	National Culture Promotion Act, 1969
28	National Monuments Act, 1969
29	Cultural Institutions Act, 1969
30	Motor Vehicle Insurance Amendment Act, 1969
31	Land Bank Amendment Act, 1969
32	Railways and Harbours Acts Amendment Act, 1969
33	Railways and Harbours Appropriation Act, 1969
34	Abolition of Juries Act, 1969
35	Post Office Appropriation Act, 1969
36	Artificial Insemination of Animals Amendment Act, 1969
37	Powers and Privileges of Provincial Councils Amendment Act, 1969
38	Admission of Persons to and Departure from the Republic Regulation Amendment Act, 1969
39	Insurance Amendment Act, 1969
40	University of Fort Hare Act, 1969
41	Second Railways and Harbours Acts Amendment Act, 1969
42	Merchant Shipping Amendment Act, 1969
43	University of Zululand Act, 1969
44	Medical, Dental and Pharmacy Amendment Act, 1969
45	Sea-shore Amendment Act, 1969
46	Wool Amendment Act, 1969
47	University of the North Act, 1969
48	Precious Stones Amendment Act, 1969
49	University of Durban-Westville Act, 1969
50	University of the Western Cape Act, 1969
51	Animal Diseases and Parasites Amendment Act, 1969
52	Marketing Amendment Act, 1969
53	Rand Water Board Statutes (Private) Act Amendment Act, 1969
54	Heraldry Amendment Act, 1969
55	Weights and Measures Amendment Act, 1969
56	National Parks Amendment Act, 1969
57	Immorality Amendment Act, 1969
58	Community Development Amendment Act, 1969
59	Post Office Re-adjustment Amendment Act, 1969
60	Broadcasting Amendment Act, 1969
61	Deeds Registries Amendment Act, 1969
62	University of South Africa (Private) Amendment Act, 1969
63	Archives Amendment Act, 1969
64	Rents Amendment Act, 1969
65	Housing Amendment Act, 1969
66	University of Port Elizabeth (Private) Amendment Act, 1969
67	Universities Amendment Act, 1969
68	Prescription Act, 1969
69	Group Areas Amendment Act, 1969
70	Rand Afrikaans University (Private) Amendment Act, 1969
71	Formalities in respect of Contracts of Sale of Land Act, 1969
72	Plant Breeders' Rights Amendment Act, 1969
73	National Education Policy Amendment Act, 1969
74	Weeds Amendment Act, 1969
75	Arms and Ammunition Act, 1969
76	Soil Conservation Act, 1969
77	Water Amendment Act, 1969
78	Orange River Development Project Act, 1969
79	Board of Trade and Industries Amendment Act, 1969
80	Financial Institutions Amendment Act, 1969
81	Security Services Special Account Act, 1969
82	Iron and Steel Industry Amendment Act, 1969
83	Aviation Amendment Act, 1969
84	Rehoboth Investment and Development Corporation Act, 1969
85	Publications and Entertainments Amendment Act, 1969
86	Public Service Amendment Act, 1969
87	South African Reserve Bank Amendment Act, 1969
88	Durban Corporation Telephone Employees' Transfer Act, 1969
89	Income Tax Act, 1969
90	Companies Amendment Act, 1969
91	Building Societies Amendment Act, 1969
92	Bantu Taxation Act, 1969 (before 1978); Black Taxation Act, 1969 (from 1978 to 1980); Taxation of Blacks Act, 1969 (after 1980)
93	Radio Amendment Act, 1969
94	Members of Statutory Bodies Pension Act, 1969
95	Medical Schemes Amendment Act, 1969
96	Expropriation of Mineral Rights (Townships) Act, 1969
97	Financial Relations Further Amendment Act, 1969
98	Pension Laws Amendment Act, 1969
99	Electoral Laws Amendment Act, 1969
100	Pensions (Supplementary) Act, 1969
101	General Law Amendment Act, 1969
102	Finance Act, 1969
103	Revenue Laws Amendment Act, 1969
104	Appropriation Act, 1969
105	Customs and Excise Amendment Act, 1969
106	Population Registration Amendment Act, 1969
