= List of acts of the Parliament of South Africa, 1970–1979 =

This is a list of acts of the Parliament of South Africa enacted in the years 1970 to 1979.

South African acts are uniquely identified by the year of passage and an act number within that year. Some acts have gone by more than one short title in the course of their existence; in such cases each title is listed with the years in which it applied.

== 1970 ==
Act no.	Short title
1	Post Office Additional Appropriation Act, 1970
2	Post Office Part Appropriation Act, 1970
3	Post Office Re-adjustment Amendment Act, 1970
4	The Apostolic Faith Mission of South Africa (Private) Amendment Act, 1970
5	Additional Appropriation Act, 1970
6	Railways and Harbours Part Appropriation Act, 1970
7	Railways and Harbours Additional Appropriation Act, 1970
8	Pneumoconiosis Compensation Amendment Act, 1970
9	Workmen's Compensation Amendment Act, 1970
10	Fuel Research Institute and Coal Amendment Act, 1970
11	Financial Relations Amendment Act, 1970
12	Electoral Laws Amendment Act, 1970
13	South-West Africa Constitution Amendment Act, 1970
14	Part Appropriation Act, 1970
15	Bible Society of South Africa Act, 1970
16	Judges' Remuneration and Pensions Amendment Act, 1970
17	General Law Amendment Act, 1970
18	Wine and Spirits Control Amendment Act, 1970
19	Bantu Laws Amendment Act, 1970 (before 1978); Black Laws Amendment Act, 1970 (after 1978)
20	Pension Laws Amendment Act, 1970
21	Industrial Conciliation Amendment Act, 1970
22	National Monuments Amendment Act, 1970
23	Financial Institutions Amendment Act, 1970
24	Anatomical Donations and Post-Morten Examinations Act, 1970
25	Finance Act, 1970
26	Bantu Homelands Citizenship Act, 1970 (before 1978); Black States Citizenship Act, 1970 (from 1978 to 1980); National States Citizenship Act, 1970 (after 1980)
27	Second Bantu Laws Amendment Act, 1970 (before 1978); Second Black Laws Amendment Act, 1970 (after 1978)
28	Defence Amendment Act, 1970
29	Population Registration Amendment Act, 1970
30	Public Health Amendment Act, 1970
31	Nursing Amendment Act, 1970
32	Mental Disorders Amendment Act, 1970
33	Uranium Enrichment Act, 1970
34	Atomic Energy Amendment Act, 1970
35	Architects' Act, 1970
36	Quantity Surveyors' Act, 1970
37	Identity Documents in South-West Africa Act, 1970
38	War Graves Amendment Act, 1970
39	Maintenance Amendment Act, 1970
40	Reciprocal Enforcement of Maintenance Orders Amendment Act, 1970
41	Supreme Court Amendment Act, 1970
42	Pre-Union Statute Law Revision Act, 1970
43	Railways and Harbours Appropriation Act, 1970
44	Bantu Education Amendment Act, 1970 (before 1978); Black Education Amendment Act, 1970 (after 1978)
45	Post Office Appropriation Act, 1970
46	Animal Diseases and Parasites Amendment Act, 1970
47	Wine and Spirit Control Act, 1970
48	National Parks Amendment Act, 1970
49	Third Bantu Laws Amendment Act, 1970 (before 1978); Third Black Laws Amendment Act, 1970 (after 1978)
50	Witchcraft Suppression Amendment Act, 1970
51	Marriage Amendment Act, 1970
52	Income Tax Act, 1970
53	Magistrates' Courts Amendment Act, 1970
54	Administration of Estates Amendment Act, 1970
55	Justices of the Peace and Commissioners of Oaths Amendment Act, 1970
56	Rents Amendment Act, 1970
57	Railways and Harbours Acts Amendment Act, 1970
58	Births, Marriages and Deaths Registration Amendment Act, 1970
59	Agricultural Pests Amendment Act, 1970
60	Fertilizers, Farm Feeds and Remedies Amendment Act, 1970
61	Egg Production Control Act, 1970
62	Wine, Other Fermented Beverages and Spirits Amendment Act, 1970
63	Mountain Catchment Areas Act, 1970
64	Land Survey Amendment Act, 1970
65	Land Surveyors' Registration Amendment Act, 1970
66	Agricultural Credit Amendment Act, 1970
67	Land Tenure Amendment Act, 1970
68	Vanwyksvlei Settlement Regulation Act, 1970
69	Marketing Amendment Act, 1970
70	Subdivision of Agricultural Land Act, 1970
71	Unauthorized Expenditure (1968–1969) Act, 1970
72	Revenue Laws Amendment Act, 1970
73	Housing Amendment Act, 1970
74	Community Development Amendment Act, 1970
75	Second Financial Institutions Amendment Act, 1970
76	Limitation and Disclosure of Finance Charges Amendment Act, 1970
77	Standards Amendment Act, 1970
78	Weights and Measures Amendment Act, 1970
79	Hire-Purchase Amendment Act, 1970
80	Police Amendment Act, 1970
81	National War Fund Act, 1970
82	Commission for Fresh Produce Markets Act, 1970
83	Paarl Mountain Act, 1970
84	Rand Afrikaans University (Private) Amendment Act, 1970
85	Expropriation Amendment Act, 1970
86	Second Pension Laws Amendment Act, 1970
87	Coloured Persons Representative Council Amendment Act, 1970
88	Drugs Control Amendment Act, 1970
89	National Supplies Procurement Act, 1970
90	National Study Loans and Bursaries Amendment Act, 1970
91	Powers and Privileges of the Coloured Persons Representative Council Act, 1970
92	General Law Further Amendment Act, 1970
93	Attorneys, Notaries and Conveyancers Admission Amendment Act, 1970
94	Limitation of Legal Proceedings (Provincial and Local Authorities) Act, 1970
95	Pensions (Supplementary) Act, 1970
96	Appropriation Act, 1970
97	Second Finance Act, 1970
98	Customs and Excise Amendment Act, 1970

== 1971 ==
Act no.	Short title
1	Constitution Amendment Act, 1971
2	Railways and Harbours Additional Appropriation Act, 1971
3	Fencing Amendment Act, 1971
4	Soil Conservation Amendment Act, 1971
5	Post Office Additional Appropriation Act, 1971
6	Bantu Authorities' Service Pensions Act, 1971 (before 1978); Black Authorities' Service Pensions Act, 1971 (after 1978)
7	Additional Appropriation Act, 1971
8	Seeds Amendment Act, 1971
9	Prisons Amendment Act, 1971
10	Agricultural Credit Amendment Act, 1971
11	Associated Institutions Provident Fund Act, 1971
12	Aliens Amendment Act, 1971
13	National Welfare Amendment Act, 1971
14	Aged Persons Amendment Act, 1971
15	War Veterans' Pensions Amendment Act, 1971
16	Blind Persons Amendment Act, 1971
17	Disability Grants Amendment Act, 1971
18	Part Appropriation Act, 1971
19	Housing Amendment Act, 1971
20	Rents Amendment Act, 1971
21	Bantu Homelands Constitution Act, 1971 (before 1978); Black States Constitution Act, 1971 (from 1978 to 1980); National States Constitution Act, 1971 (from 1980 to 1990); Self-governing Territories Constitution Act, 1971 (after 1990)
22	Railways and Harbours Appropriation Act, 1971
23	Railways and Harbours Unauthorized Expenditure Act, 1971
24	Railways and Harbours Acts Amendment Act, 1971
25	Railway Purchase Act, 1971
26	Post Office Appropriation Act, 1971
27	Financial Relations Amendment Act, 1971
28	University of Fort Hare Amendment Act, 1971
29	Extension of University Education Amendment Act, 1971
30	National Monuments Amendment Act, 1971
31	Transkei Constitution Amendment Act, 1971
32	Publications and Entertainments Amendment Act, 1971
33	Payment of Members of Parliament Amendment Act, 1971
34	Water Research Act, 1971
35	Railways and Harbours Pensions Act, 1971
36	Water Amendment Act, 1971
37	Forest Amendment Act, 1971
38	Second Soil Conservation Amendment Act, 1971
39	Armaments Amendment Act, 1971
40	Mines and Works Amendment Act, 1971
41	Abuse of Dependence-producing Substances and Rehabilitation Centres Act, 1971
42	Public Health Amendment Act, 1971
43	Medical, Dental and Pharmacy Amendment Act, 1971
44	Unauthorized Expenditure (1969–1970) Act, 1971
45	Bantu Affairs Administration Act, 1971 (before 1978); Black Affairs Administration Act, 1971 (after 1978)
46	Trade Marks Amendment Act, 1971
47	Sea Fisheries Amendment Act, 1971
48	Canned Fruit Export Marketing Amendment Act, 1971
49	Electricity Amendment Act, 1971
50	Marburg Immigration Settlement Regulation Act, 1971
51	Agricultural Produce Export Act, 1971
52	Land Survey Amendment Act, 1971
53	Expropriation Amendment Act, 1971
54	National Roads Act, 1971
55	Admission of Persons to the Republic Regulation Amendment Act, 1971
56	Legal Aid Amendment Act, 1971
57	Suretyship Amendment Act, 1971
58	Apportionment of Damages Amendment Act, 1971
59	Transport (Co-ordination) Amendment Act, 1971
60	Workmen's Compensation Amendment Act, 1971
61	Unemployment Insurance Amendment Act, 1971
62	Unauthorized Post Office Expenditure Act, 1971
63	Newspaper and Imprint Registration Act, 1971 (before 1993); Newspaper Registration Act, 1971 (after 1993)
64	Electoral Laws Amendment Act, 1971
65	Public Service Amendment Act, 1971
66	Sectional Titles Act, 1971
67	Prevention and Combating of Pollution of the Sea by Oil Act, 1971
68	Community Development Amendment Act, 1971
69	Slums Amendment Act, 1971
70	University of the Orange Free State (Private) Amendment Act, 1971
71	Legal Practitioners' Fidelity Fund Amendment Act, 1971
72	Sale of Land on Instalments Act, 1971
73	Atomic Energy Amendment Act, 1971
74	State Tender Board and State Procurement Board Amendment Act, 1971
75	Export Credit Re-insurance Amendment Act, 1971
76	Chiropractors Act, 1971
77	Second Financial Relations Amendment Act, 1971
78	Marketing Amendment Act, 1971
79	Administration of Estates Amendment Act, 1971
80	General Law Amendment Act, 1971
81	Parliamentary Service and Administrators' Pensions Act, 1971
82	Railway Construction Act, 1971
83	Second Railway Construction Act, 1971
84	Second Railways and Harbours Additional Appropriation Act, 1971
85	Second Railways and Harbours Acts Amendment Act, 1971
86	Stock Exchanges Control Amendment Act, 1971
87	Appropriation Act, 1971
88	Income Tax Act, 1971
89	Customs and Excise Amendment Act, 1971
90	Further Unauthorized Expenditure (1968–1969) Act, 1971
91	Finance Act, 1971
92	Revenue Laws Amendment Act, 1971
93	Pension Laws Amendment Act, 1971
94	Pensions (Supplementary) Act, 1971
95	Drugs Laws Amendment Act, 1971
96	Dairy Industry Amendment Act, 1971
97	Chartered Accountants Designation Amendment (Private) Act, 1971

== 1972 ==
Act no.	Short title
1	Railways and Harbours Additional Appropriation Act, 1972
2	Suppression of Communism Amendment Act, 1972
3	Deeds Registries Amendment Act, 1972
4	Prisons Amendment Act, 1972
5	Admiralty Jurisdiction Regulation Act, 1972
6	Insolvency Amendment Act, 1972
7	Animals Protection Amendment Act, 1972
8	Additional Appropriation Act, 1972
9	National Road Safety Act, 1972
10	Civil Aviation Offences Act, 1972
11	Bantu Transport Services Amendment Act, 1972 (before 1978); Black Transport Services Amendment Act, 1972 (after 1978)
12	Broadcasting Amendment Act, 1972
13	Part Appropriation Act, 1972
14	Post Office Additional Appropriation Act, 1972
15	Agricultural Credit Amendment Act, 1972
16	Land Tenure Amendment Act, 1972
17	Fertilizers, Farm Feeds, Agricultural Remedies and Stock Remedies Amendment Act, 1972
18	Provincial Finance and Audit Act, 1972
19	Veterinary Amendment Act, 1972
20	Bantu Education Account Abolition Act, 1972 (before 1978); Black Education Account Abolition Act, 1972 (after 1978)
21	Railways and Harbours Appropriation Act, 1972
22	Eastern Province Guardian Loan and Investment Company Amendment, Indemnity and Further Powers (Private) Act Amendment (Private) Act, 1972
23	Bantu Laws Amendment Act, 1972 (before 1978); Black Laws Amendment Act, 1972 (after 1978)
24	Post Office Appropriation Act, 1972
25	Provincial Licence Duties Act, 1972
26	Marriage Amendment Act, 1972
27	Transport Services for Coloured Persons and Indians Act, 1972
28	Harbour Construction Act, 1972
29	Contributions in Respect of Bantu Labour Act, 1972 (before 1978); Contributions in Respect of Black Labour Act, 1972 (after 1978)
30	Second Bantu Laws Amendment Act, 1972 (before 1978); Second Black Laws Amendment Act, 1972 (after 1978)
31	Rand Water Board Statutes (Private) Act Amendment Act, 1972
32	Dairy Industry Laws Amendment Act, 1972
33	Railways and Harbours Acts Amendment Act, 1972
34	Land Titles (Division of George) Adjustment Act, 1972
35	Tobacco and Wine Research Accounts Amendment Act, 1972
36	Animal Slaughter, Meat and Animal Products Hygiene Amendment Act, 1972
37	Agricultural Research Account Amendment Act, 1972
38	Sea-shore Amendment Act, 1972
39	Perishable Agricultural Produce Sales Amendment Act, 1972
40	National War Fund Amendment Act, 1972
41	Land Bank Amendment Act, 1972
42	Anatomical Donations and Post-Mortem Examinations Amendment Act, 1972
43	Dental Mechanicians Amendment Act, 1972
44	Second Additional Appropriation Act, 1972
45	Water Amendment Act, 1972
46	Forest Amendment Act, 1972
47	Mines, Works and Minerals in South-West Africa Amendment Act, 1972
48	National Institute for Metallurgy Amendment Act, 1972
49	Medical Schemes Amendment Act, 1972
50	Nursing Amendment Act, 1972
51	Rents Amendment Act, 1972
52	Professional Engineers' Amendment Act, 1972
53	Church Square, Pretoria, Development Act, 1972
54	Foodstuffs, Cosmetics and Disinfectants Act, 1972
55	Subdivision of Agricultural Land Amendment Act, 1972
56	Compulsory Motor Vehicle Insurance Act, 1972
57	Age of Majority Act, 1972
58	Public Service Amendment Act, 1972
59	Admission of Persons to the Republic Regulation Act, 1972
60	Educational Services Amendment Act, 1972
61	Provincial Affairs Act, 1972
62	Wine, Other Fermented Beverages and Spirits Amendment Act, 1972
63	Coloured Persons in South-West Africa Education Act, 1972
64	Security Intelligence and State Security Council Act, 1972
65	Armaments Development and Production Amendment Act, 1972
66	Defence Amendment Act, 1972
67	South African Indian Council Amendment Act, 1972
68	Marketing Amendment Act, 1972
69	Control of the Meat Trade in South-West Africa Amendment Act, 1972
70	Wine and Spirit Control Amendment Act, 1972
71	Land Survey Amendment Act, 1972
72	Sale of Land on Instalments Amendment Act, 1972
73	Hire-Purchase Amendment Act, 1972
74	Explosives Amendment Act, 1972
75	Copyright Amendment Act, 1972
76	Unauthorized Post Office Expenditure Act, 1972
77	Railway Construction Act, 1972
78	Weather Modification Control Act, 1972
79	Namaland Consolidation and Administration Act, 1972
80	Unauthorized Expenditure Act, 1972
81	Rhodes University (Private) Amendment Act, 1972
82	Motor Carrier Transportation Amendment Act, 1972
83	Group Areas Amendment Act, 1972
84	Business Names Amendment Act, 1972
85	Basters of Rehoboth Education Act, 1972
86	Nama in South-West Africa Education Act, 1972
87	Appropriation Act, 1972
88	Finance Act, 1972
89	Revenue Laws Amendment Act, 1972
90	Income Tax Act, 1972
91	Financial Institutions Amendment Act, 1972
92	Prevention and Combating of Pollution of the Sea by Oil Amendment Act, 1972
93	Community Development Amendment Act, 1972
94	Police Amendment Act, 1972
95	Pneumoconiosis Compensation Laws Amendment Act, 1972
96	Chiropractors Amendment Act, 1972
97	Pension Laws Amendment Act, 1972
98	Pensions (Supplementary) Act, 1972
99	Coloured Persons Representative Council Amendment Act, 1972
100	Post Office Re-adjustment Amendment Act, 1972
101	Post Office Amendment Act, 1972
102	General Law Amendment Act, 1972
103	Customs and Excise Amendment Act, 1972

== 1973 ==
Act no.	Short title
1	Railways and Harbours Loans Act, 1973
2	Railways and Harbours Additional Appropriation Act, 1973
3	Agricultural Pests Act, 1973
4	Additional Appropriation Act, 1973
5	University Education (Agricultural and Veterinary Science Affairs) Act, 1973
6	Bantu Universities Amendment Act, 1973 (before 1978); Black Universities Amendment Act, 1973 (after 1978)
7	Bantu Laws Amendment Act, 1973 (before 1978); Black Laws Amendment Act, 1973 (after 1978)
8	Part Appropriation Act, 1973
9	Animal Diseases and Parasites Amendment Act, 1973
10	Livestock Brands Amendment Act, 1973
11	Soil Conservation Amendment Act, 1973
12	Marriage Amendment Act, 1973
13	Stock Theft Amendment Act, 1973
14	Nursing Amendment Act, 1973
15	Hazardous Substances Act, 1973
16	Medical, Dental and Pharmacy Amendment Act, 1973
17	Atmospheric Pollution Prevention Amendment Act, 1973
18	Mental Health Act, 1973
19	South African Law Commission Act, 1973 (before 2003); South African Law Reform Commission Act, 1973 (after 2003)
20	Development of Self-government for Native Nations in South-West Africa Amendment Act, 1973
21	Rhodes University (Private) Amendment Act, 1973
22	University of South Africa (Private) Amendment Act, 1973
23	Railways and Harbours Appropriation Act, 1973
24	Post Office Additional Appropriation Act, 1973
25	Post Office Appropriation Act, 1973
26	Defence Amendment Act, 1973
27	Fuel Research Institute and Coal Amendment Act, 1973
28	Sishen–Saldanha Bay Railway Construction Act, 1973
29	Saldanha Bay Harbour Construction Act, 1973
30	Abattoir Commission Amendment Act, 1973
31	Marketing Amendment Act, 1973
32	Land Titles (Division of Oudtshoorn) Adjustment Act, 1973
33	Perishable Agricultural Produce Sales Amendment Act, 1973
34	Police Amendment Act, 1973
35	Arms and Ammunition Amendment Act, 1973
36	Population Registration and Identity Documents Amendment Act, 1973
37	Social Pensions Act, 1973
38	Poor Relief and Charitable Institutions Ordinance, 1919 (Cape) Amendment Act, 1973
39	Public Holidays Amendment Act, 1973
40	Aliens Control Act, 1973
41	South African Citizenship Amendment Act, 1973
42	Provincial Affairs Act, 1973
43	Air Services Amendment Act, 1973
44	Government Villages Act, 1973
45	Forest Amendment Act, 1973
46	Sea Birds and Seals Protection Act, 1973
47	Railways and Harbours Acts Amendment Act, 1973
48	Trade Marks in South West Africa Act, 1973
49	South African Reserve Bank Amendment Act, 1973
50	"Woordeboek van die Afrikaanse Taal" Act, 1973
51	Boxing and Wrestling Control Amendment Act, 1973
52	Gatherings and Demonstrations Act, 1973 (before 1992); Gatherings and Demonstrations in the Vicinity of Parliament Act, 1973 (after 1992)
53	Coloured Persons Education Amendment Act, 1973
54	Public Service Amendment Act, 1973
55	Fishing Industry Development Amendment Act, 1973
56	Post Office Amendment Act, 1973
57	Government Service Pension Act, 1973
58	Sea Fisheries Act, 1973
59	Anatomical Donations and Post-Mortem Examinations Amendment Act, 1973
60	University of Durban-Westville Amendment Act, 1973
61	Companies Act, 1973
62	General Law Amendment Act, 1973
63	Finance Act, 1973
64	Appropriation Act, 1973
65	Income Tax Act, 1973
66	Revenue Laws Amendment Act, 1973
67	Financial Institutions Amendment Act, 1973
68	Customs and Excise Amendment Act, 1973
69	Education Laws Amendment Act, 1973
70	Bantu Labour Relations Regulation Amendment Act, 1973 (before 1978); Black Labour Relations Regulation Amendment Act, 1973 (after 1978)
71	Railways Construction Act, 1973
72	Prevention and Combating of Pollution of the Sea by Oil Amendment Act, 1973
73	Pension Laws Amendment Act, 1973
74	Children's Amendment Act, 1973
75	Pensions (Supplementary) Act, 1973
76	Measuring Units and National Measuring Standards Act, 1973
77	Trade Metrology Act, 1973
78	Occupational Diseases in Mines and Works Act, 1973
79	Constitution and Elections Amendment Act, 1973
80	Abuse of Dependence-producing Substances and Rehabilitation Centres Amendment Act, 1973

== 1974 ==
Act no.	Short title
1	Electoral Laws Amendment Act, 1974
2	Railways and Harbours Part Appropriation Act, 1974
3	Railways and Harbours Additional Appropriation Act, 1974
4	Post Office Additional Appropriation Act, 1974
5	Post Office Part Appropriation Act, 1974
6	Defence Special Account Act, 1974
7	Customs and Excise Amendment Act, 1974
8	Defence Amendment Act, 1974
9	"Vlaglied" Copyright Act, 1974
10	Membership of the Parliamentary Medical Scheme Act, 1974
11	Workmen's Compensation Amendment Act, 1974
12	Unemployment Insurance Amendment Act, 1974
13	Post Office Amendment Act, 1974
14	Strategic Mineral Resources Development Amendment Act, 1974
15	Pension Laws Amendment Act, 1974
16	Water Research Amendment Act, 1974
17	Part Appropriation Act, 1974
18	Additional Appropriation Act, 1974
19	Subdivision of Agricultural Land Amendment Act, 1974
20	Veterinary Amendment Act, 1974
21	Soil Conservation Amendment Act, 1974
22	Compulsory Motor Vehicle Insurance Amendment Act, 1974
23	Motor Carrier Transportation Amendment Act, 1974
24	Merchant Shipping Amendment Act, 1974
25	Weather Modification Control Amendment Act, 1974
26	National Roads Amendment Act, 1974
27	Occupational Diseases in Mines and Works Amendment Act, 1974
28	International Health Regulations Act, 1974
29	General Law Amendment Act, 1974
30	Riotous Assemblies Amendment Act, 1974
31	Affected Organizations Act, 1974
32	Criminal Procedure Amendment Act, 1974
33	Parliamentary Service Act, 1974
34	Post Office Appropriation Act, 1974
35	Iron and Steel Industry Amendment Act, 1974
36	Board of Trade and Industries Amendment Act, 1974
37	Uranium Enrichment Amendment Act, 1974
38	Nuclear Installations (Licensing and Security) Amendment Act, 1974
39	Atomic Energy Amendment Act, 1974
40	Payment of Members of Parliament Act, 1974
41	Second Part Appropriation Act, 1974
42	Publications Act, 1974
43	Railways and Harbours Pensions for Non-Whites Act, 1974
44	Railways and Harbours Acts Amendment Act, 1974
45	Railways and Harbours Pensions Further Amendment Act, 1974
46	National Road Safety Amendment Act, 1974
47	Bantu Transport Services Amendment Act, 1974 (before 1978); Black Transport Services Amendment Act, 1974 (after 1978)
48	Constitution Amendment Act, 1974
49	Railways and Harbours Appropriation Act, 1974
50	Radio Amendment Act, 1974
51	Births, Marriages and Deaths Registration Amendment Act, 1974
52	Homeopaths, Naturopaths, Osteopaths and Herbalists Act, 1974
53	Pharmacy Act, 1974
54	Judges' Remuneration and Pensions Amendment Act, 1974
55	Financial Relations Amendment Act, 1974
56	Medical, Dental and Supplementary Health Service Professions Act, 1974 (before 1998); Health Professions Act, 1974 (after 1998)
57	Forest Amendment Act, 1974
58	Water Amendment Act, 1974
59	Wattle Bark Industry Amendment Act, 1974
60	Electricity Amendment Act, 1974
61	Expropriation (Establishment of Undertakings) Amendment Act, 1974
62	Limitation and Disclosure of Finance Charges Amendment Act, 1974
63	Mentally Retarded Children's Training Act, 1974
64	Second Customs and Excise Amendment Act, 1974
65	Drugs Control Amendment Act, 1974
66	Post Office Service Act, 1974 (before 1997); Communications Service Act, 1974 (after 1997)
67	Occupational Diseases in Mines and Works Amendment Act, 1974
68	Police Amendment Act, 1974
69	University of the Orange Free State (Private) Amendment Act, 1974
70	Bantu Laws Amendment Act, 1974 (before 1978); Black Laws Amendment Act, 1974 (after 1978)
71	Second Bantu Laws Amendment Act, 1974 (before 1978); Second Black Laws Amendment Act, 1974 (after 1978)
72	Group Areas Amendment Act, 1974
73	Marketing Amendment Act, 1974
74	Wine and Spirit Control Amendment Act, 1974
75	Wine, Other Fermented Beverages and Spirits Amendment Act, 1974
76	Companies Amendment Act, 1974
77	Second Pension Laws Amendment Act, 1974
78	Pensions (Supplementary) Act, 1974
79	Members of the Coloured Persons Representative Council Pensions Act, 1974
80	Railway Construction Act, 1974
81	Appropriation Act, 1974
82	Parliamentary Medical Aid Scheme Act, 1974
83	Defence Further Amendment Act, 1974
84	Finance Act, 1974
85	Income Tax Act, 1974
86	Members of the South African Indian Council Pensions Act, 1974
87	Second Judges' Remuneration and Pensions Amendment Act, 1974
88	Revenue Laws Amendment Act, 1974
89	National Supplies Procurement Amendment Act, 1974
90	National Parks Amendment Act, 1974
91	Hotels Amendment Act, 1974
92	National Education Policy Amendment Act, 1974
93	Cultural Institutions Amendment Act, 1974
94	Second General Law Amendment Act, 1974

== 1975 ==
Act no.	Short title
1	Railways and Harbours Additional Appropriation Act, 1975
2	Abortion and Sterilization Act, 1975
3	South-West Africa Diamond Industry Protection Amendment Act, 1975
4	Public Service Amendment Act, 1975
5	Fishing Industry Development Amendment Act, 1975
6	Prisons Amendment Act, 1975
7	Additional Appropriation Act, 1975
8	Part Appropriation Act, 1975
9	Bantu Laws Amendment Act, 1975 (before 1978); Black Laws Amendment Act, 1975 (after 1978)
10	Mineral Laws Supplementary Act, 1975
11	Uranium Enrichment Amendment Act, 1975
12	Agricultural Produce Agency Sales Act, 1975
13	Animal Slaughter, Meat and Animal Products Hygiene Amendment Act, 1975
14	Judges' Remuneration and Pensions Act, 1975
15	Police Amendment Act, 1975
16	Precious Stones Amendment Act, 1975
17	National Education Policy Amendment Act, 1975
18	Architects' Amendment Act, 1975
19	Community Development Amendment Act, 1975
20	Provincial Powers Extension Amendment Act, 1975
21	Railways and Harbours Appropriation Act, 1975
22	Group Areas Amendment Act, 1975
23	National Institute for Metallurgy Amendment Act, 1975
24	Groot Constantia State Estate Control Act, 1975
25	Post Office Appropriation Act, 1975
26	Wine and Spirit Control Amendment Act, 1975
27	Land Titles (Division of George) Adjustment Amendment Act, 1975
28	Parliamentary and Provincial Medical Aid Scheme Act, 1975
29	Gold Mines Assistance Amendment Act, 1975
30	Rents Amendment Act, 1975
31	Human Sciences Research Amendment Act, 1975
32	Coloured Persons Representative Council Amendment Act, 1975
33	Criminal Procedure Amendment Act, 1975
34	Trade Metrology Amendment Act, 1975
35	Explosives Amendment Act, 1975
36	Forest Amendment Act, 1975
37	Water Research Amendment Act, 1975
38	Marketing Amendment Act, 1975
39	Lake Areas Development Act, 1975
40	Housing Amendment Act, 1975
41	Law Societies' Act, 1975
42	Water Amendment Act, 1975
43	Medical Schemes Amendment Act, 1975
44	Co-operative Societies Amendment Act, 1975
45	Occupational Diseases in Mines and Works Amendment Act, 1975
46	Railways and Harbours Acts Amendment Act, 1975
47	Industrial Development Amendment Act, 1975
48	Regulation of Monopolistic Conditions Amendment Act, 1975
49	Sale of Land on Instalments Amendment Act, 1975
50	Pension Laws Amendment Act, 1975
51	Unemployment Insurance Amendment Act, 1975
52	Land Bank Amendment Act, 1975
53	Public Accountants' and Auditors' Amendment Act, 1975
54	National Supplies Procurement Amendment Act, 1975
55	Prescribed Rate of Interest Act, 1975
56	Second Liquor Amendment Act, 1975
57	General Law Amendment Act, 1975
58	Liquor Amendment Act, 1975
59	University of Pretoria (Private) Amendment Act, 1975
60	Natal Ecclesiastical Properties and Trusts Amendment (Private) Act, 1975
61	Transkei Constitution Amendment Act, 1975
62	Second Wine and Spirit Control Amendment Act, 1975
63	Expropriation Act, 1975
64	Copyright Amendment Act, 1975
65	Appropriation Act, 1975
66	Exchequer and Audit Act, 1975
67	Universities Amendment Act, 1975
68	Pensions (Supplementary) Act, 1975
69	Income Tax Act, 1975
70	Revenue Laws Amendment Act, 1975
71	Customs and Excise Amendment Act, 1975
72	Finance Act, 1975
73	Physical Planning and Utilization of Resources Amendment Act, 1975

== 1976 ==
Act no.	Short title
1	Defence Amendment Act, 1976
2	Simulated Armaments Transactions Prohibition Act, 1976
3	Transkei Constitution Amendment Act, 1976
4	Bantu Laws Amendment Act, 1976 (before 1978); Black Laws Amendment Act, 1976 (after 1978)
5	Merchant Shipping Amendment Act, 1976
6	Advertising on Roads and Ribbon Development Amendment Act, 1976
7	Dairy Industry Amendment Act, 1976
8	Railways and Harbours Acts Amendment Act, 1976
9	Railways and Harbours Additional Appropriation Act, 1976
10	Additional Appropriation Act, 1976
11	Post Office Additional Appropriation Act, 1976
12	Part Appropriation Act, 1976
13	Matrimonial Affairs Amendment Act, 1976
14	Attorneys Amendment Act, 1976
15	Plant Breeders' Rights Act, 1976
16	Hazardous Substances Amendment Act, 1976
17	Dental Mechanicians Amendment Act, 1976
18	Abortion and Sterilization Amendment Act, 1976
19	Medicines and Related Substances Control Amendment Act, 1976
20	Chiropractors Amendment Act, 1976
21	Electricity Amendment Act, 1976
22	Sea Fisheries Amendment Act, 1976
23	Regulation of Monopolistic Conditions Amendment Act, 1976
24	Iron and Steel Industry Amendment Act, 1976
25	Sale of Land on Instalments Amendment Act, 1976
26	State Land Disposal Amendment Act, 1976
27	Water Amendment Act, 1976
28	Rural Coloured Areas Amendment Act, 1976
29	Coloured Persons Education Amendment Act, 1976
30	Coloured Persons in South-West Africa Education Amendment Act, 1976
31	Basters of Rehoboth Education Amendment Act, 1976
32	Nama in South-West Africa Education Amendment Act, 1976
33	Medical, Dental and Supplementary Health Service Professions Amendment Act, 1976
34	Police Amendment Act, 1976
35	Petition Proceedings Replacement Act, 1976
36	Pre-Union Statute Law Revision Act, 1976
37	Supreme Court Amendment Act, 1976
38	Scientific Research Council Amendment Act, 1976
39	Price Control Amendment Act, 1976
40	National Road Safety Amendment Act, 1976
41	Mountain Catchment Areas Amendment Act, 1976
42	Weza Timber Company Limited Act, 1976
43	Children's Amendment Act, 1976
44	National Welfare Amendment Act, 1976
45	Public Health Amendment Act, 1976
46	Aged Persons Amendment Act, 1976
47	Mining Rights Amendment Act, 1976
48	Mental Health Amendment Act, 1976
49	Railways and Harbours Appropriation Act, 1976
50	Marketing Amendment Act, 1976
51	Financial Relations Amendment Act, 1976
52	Railways and Harbours Finances and Accounts Act, 1976
53	Plant Improvement Act, 1976
54	Abattoir Industry Act, 1976
55	Post Office Appropriation Act, 1976
56	Rehoboth Self-Government Act, 1976
57	National Parks Act, 1976
58	Forest Amendment Act, 1976
59	Standards Amendment Act, 1976
60	Constitution Amendment Act, 1976
61	Parliamentary and Provincial Medical Aid Scheme Amendment Act, 1976
62	Appeals from the Supreme Court of Transkei Act, 1976
63	Magistrates' Courts Amendment Act, 1976
64	Public Service Amendment Act, 1976
65	Financial Relations Act, 1976
66	Statistics Act, 1976
67	Parliamentary Internal Security Commission Act, 1976
68	Wine, Other Fermented Beverages and Spirits Amendment Act, 1976
69	Wine and Spirit Control Amendment Act, 1976
70	National Supplies Procurement Amendment Act, 1976
71	Fuel Research Institute and Coal Amendment Act, 1976
72	Sishen-Saldanha Bay Railway Construction Amendment Act, 1976
73	Broadcasting Act, 1976
74	South African Shipping Board Act, 1976
75	Judges' Remuneration and Pensions Amendment Act, 1976
76	Trade Practices Act, 1976
77	Saldanha Bay Harbour Construction Amendment Act, 1976
78	Medical University of Southern Africa Act, 1976
79	Internal Security Amendment Act, 1976
80	Rent Control Act, 1976
81	Gold Mines Assistance Amendment Act, 1976
82	Uranium Enrichment Amendment Act, 1976
83	Pension Laws Amendment Act, 1976
84	Military Pensions Act, 1976
85	War Damage Insurance and Compensation Act, 1976
86	Bantu Employees' In-Service Training Act, 1976 (before 1978); Black Employees' In-Service Training Act, 1976 (after 1978)
87	Compulsory Motor Vehicle Insurance Amendment Act, 1976
88	Motor Carrier Transportation Amendment Act, 1976
89	Second Railways and Harbours Acts Amendment Act, 1976
90	Railway Construction Act, 1976
91	Nuclear Installations (Licensing and Security) Amendment Act, 1976
92	Prevention of Illegal Squatting Amendment Act, 1976
93	Registration of Deeds in Rehoboth Act, 1976
94	Coloured Persons Representative Council Amendment Act, 1976
95	Second Coloured Persons Education Amendment Act, 1976
96	Pensions (Supplementary) Act, 1976
97	Public Service and Post Office Service Amendment Act, 1976
98	Electoral Laws Amendment Act, 1976
99	Saldanha Bay Harbour Acquisition and Equipment Act, 1976
100	Status of the Transkei Act, 1976
101	Financial Institutions Amendment Act, 1976
102	Finance Act, 1976
103	Income Tax Act, 1976
104	Revenue Laws Amendment Act, 1976
105	Customs and Excise Amendment Act, 1976
106	Financial Arrangements with the Transkei Act, 1976
107	Kakamas Trust Act, 1976
108	Second Unemployment Insurance Amendment Act, 1976
109	Land Bank Amendment Act, 1976
110	Bantu Trust and Land Amendment Act, 1976 (before 1978); Development Trust and Land Amendment Act, 1976 (after 1978)
111	Companies Amendment Act, 1976
112	Estate Agents Act, 1976 (before 1999); Estate Agency Affairs Act, 1976 (after 1999)
113	Post Office Amendment Act, 1976
114	University of Port Elizabeth (Private) Amendment Act, 1976
115	Second Attorneys Amendment Act, 1976
116	South African Teachers' Council for Whites Act, 1976
117	Appropriation Act, 1976

== 1977 ==
Act no.	Short title
1	Sectional Titles Amendment Act, 1977
2	Abolition of Civil Imprisonment Act, 1977
3	Supreme Court Amendment Act, 1977
4	Legal Practitioners' Fidelity Fund Amendment Act, 1977
5	Judges' Remuneration and Pensions Amendment Act, 1977
6	Part Appropriation Act, 1977
7	Railways and Harbours Additional Appropriation Act, 1977
8	Post Office Additional Appropriation Act, 1977
9	University of Cape Town (Private) Amendment Act, 1977
10	Additional Appropriation Act, 1977
11	Finance and Financial Adjustments Acts Consolidation Act, 1977
12	Customs and Excise Amendment Act, 1977
13	Indemnity Act, 1977
14	Abuse of Dependence-producing Substances and Rehabilitation Centres Amendment Act, 1977
15	Children's Amendment Act, 1977
16	Prohibition of the Exhibition of Films on Sundays and Public Holidays Act, 1977
17	National Culture Promotion Amendment Act, 1977
18	Subdivision of Agricultural Land Amendment Act, 1977
19	Expropriation Amendment Act, 1977
20	Armaments Development and Production Amendment Act, 1977
21	Land Surveyors' Registration Amendment Act, 1977
22	Soil Conservation Amendment Act, 1977
23	Land Survey Amendment Act, 1977
24	Fertilizers, Farm Feeds, Agricultural Remedies and Stock Remedies Amendment Act, 1977
25	Livestock Improvement Act, 1977
26	Pension Laws Amendment Act, 1977
27	Moratorium Amendment Act, 1977
28	Workmen's Compensation Amendment Act, 1977
29	Unemployment Insurance Amendment Act, 1977
30	Constitution Amendment Act, 1977
31	Financial Relations Amendment Act, 1977
32	Provincial Affairs Amendment Act, 1977
33	Population Registration and Identity Documents in South-West Africa Amendment Act, 1977
34	Electoral Laws Amendment Act, 1977
35	Defence Amendment Act, 1977
36	Health Laws Amendment Act, 1977
37	Fuel Research Institute and Coal Amendment Act, 1977
38	State Oil Fund Act, 1977 (before 1985); Central Energy Fund Act, 1977 (after 1985)
39	Admission of Advocates Amendment Act, 1977
40	Recognition and Enforcement of Foreign Arbitral Awards Act, 1977
41	Deeds Registries Amendment Act, 1977
42	Interpretation Amendment Act, 1977
43	Pre-Union Statute Law Revision Act, 1977
44	Liquor Amendment Act, 1977
45	Railways and Harbours Appropriation Act, 1977
46	Inquests Amendment Act, 1977
47	Railway and Harbour Purchase Act, 1977
48	Railways and Harbours Finances and Accounts Act, 1977
49	Post Office Appropriation Act, 1977
50	Indian Industrial Development Corporation Act, 1977
51	Criminal Procedure Act, 1977
52	Educational Services Amendment Act, 1977
53	War Graves Amendment Act, 1977
54	Archives Amendment Act, 1977
55	Removal of Restrictions Amendment Act, 1977
56	Bantu Education Amendment Act, 1977 (before 1978); Black Education Amendment Act, 1977 (after 1978)
57	Bantu Universities Amendment Act, 1977 (before 1978); Black Universities Amendment Act, 1977 (after 1978)
58	Bills of Exchange Amendment Act, 1977
59	South African Tourist Corporation Amendment Act, 1977
60	Scientific Research Council Amendment Act, 1977
61	Import and Export Control Amendment Act, 1977
62	Registration of Copyright in Cinematograph Films Act, 1977
63	Health Act, 1977
64	Companies Amendment Act, 1977
65	Universities Amendment Act, 1977
66	University of Natal (Private) Amendment Act, 1977
67	Civil Defence Act, 1977 (before 1990); Civil Protection Act, 1977 (after 1990)
68	Second Defence Amendment Act, 1977
69	Railways and Harbours Acts Amendment Act, 1977
70	Merchant Shipping Amendment Act, 1977
71	Hotels Amendment Act, 1977
72	Prevention of Illegal Squatting Amendment Act, 1977
73	Transport (Co-ordination) Amendment Act, 1977
74	Road Transportation Act, 1977
75	National Institute for Metallurgy Amendment Act, 1977
76	Atomic Energy Amendment Act, 1977
77	Tiger's-Eye Control Act, 1977
78	Urban Transport Act, 1977
79	Publications Amendment Act, 1977
80	Promotion of the Economic Development of Bantu Homelands Amendment Act, 1977 (before 1978); Promotion of the Economic Development of Black States Amendment Act, 1977 (from 1978 to 1980); Promotion of the Economic Development of National States Amendment Act, 1977 (after 1980)
81	Agricultural Credit Amendment Act, 1977
82	Common Pasture Management Act, 1977
83	Mines and Works Amendment Act, 1977
84	Bantu Labour Relations Regulation Amendment Act, 1977 (before 1978); Black Labour Relations Regulation Amendment Act, 1977 (after 1978)
85	Expropriation (Establishment of Undertakings) Amendment Act, 1977
86	Second Supreme Court Amendment Act, 1977
87	Liquor Act, 1977
88	Prisons Amendment Act, 1977
89	Status of Bophuthatswana Act, 1977
90	Police Amendment Act, 1977
91	Lower Courts Amendment Act, 1977
92	South African Reserve Bank Amendment Act, 1977
93	Financial Arrangements with Bophuthatswana Act, 1977
94	Financial Institutions Amendment Act, 1977
95	South-West Africa Constitution Amendment Act, 1977
96	Group Areas Amendment Act, 1977
97	Railway and Harbour Purchase Amendment Act, 1977
98	Territorial Waters Amendment Act, 1977
99	Sea Fisheries Amendment Act, 1977
100	Standards Amendment Act, 1977
101	Explosives Amendment Act, 1977
102	Electricity Amendment Act, 1977
103	National Building Regulations and Building Standards Act, 1977
104	Environment Planning Amendment Act, 1977
105	Vaal River Development Scheme Amendment Act, 1977
106	Water Research Amendment Act, 1977
107	Rand Water Board Statutes (Private) Act Amendment Act, 1977
108	Water Amendment Act, 1977
109	Marketing Amendment Act, 1977
110	Appropriation Act, 1977
111	Finance Act, 1977
112	Second Customs and Excise Amendment Act, 1977
113	Income Tax Act, 1977
114	Revenue Laws Amendment Act, 1977
115	Second Bantu Laws Amendment Act, 1977 (before 1978); Second Black Laws Amendment Act, 1977 (after 1978)
116	Pensions (Supplementary) Act, 1977
117	Occupational Diseases in Mines and Works Amendment Act, 1977
118	Second Unemployment Insurance Amendment Act, 1977
119	Bantu Laws Amendment Act, 1977 (before 1978); Black Laws Amendment Act, 1977 (after 1978)
120	Petroleum Products Act, 1977
121	University of Durban-Westville Amendment Act, 1977
122	Electoral Act for Indians, 1977
123	South African Indian Council Amendment Act, 1977
124	Housing Amendment Act, 1977
125	Community Councils Act, 1977
126	Community Development Amendment Act, 1977
127	University of the Western Cape Amendment Act, 1977

== 1978 ==
Act no.	Short title
1	Post Office Amendment Act, 1978
2	Radio Amendment Act, 1978
3	Expropriation Amendment Act, 1978
4	Fencing Amendment Act, 1978
5	Armaments Development and Production Amendment Act, 1978
6	Unemployment Insurance Amendment Act, 1978
7	Railways and Harbours Additional Appropriation Act, 1978
8	Bophuthatswana Border Extension Act, 1978
9	Sugar Act, 1978
10	Mental Health Amendment Act, 1978
11	Health Donations Fund Act, 1978
12	Bantu Laws Amendment Act, 1978 (before 1978); Black Laws Amendment Act, 1978 (after 1978)
13	Bantu Homelands Citizenship Amendment Act, 1978 (before 1978); Black States Citizenship Amendment Act, 1978 (from 1978 to 1980); National States Citizenship Amendment Act, 1978 (after 1980)
14	Police Amendment Act, 1978
15	Administration of Estates Amendment Act, 1978
16	Arms and Ammunition Amendment Act, 1978
17	Judges' Remuneration and Pensions Amendment Act, 1978
18	Second-hand Goods Amendment Act, 1978
19	Community Development Amendment Act, 1978
20	Slums Amendment Act, 1978
21	Housing Amendment Act, 1978
22	Nuclear Installations (Licensing and Security) Amendment Act, 1978
23	National Study Loans and Bursaries Amendment Act, 1978
24	South African Teachers' Council for Whites Amendment Act, 1978
25	National Education Policy Amendment Act, 1978
26	Additional Appropriation Act, 1978
27	Provincial Finance and Audit Amendment Act, 1978
28	Community Councils Amendment Act, 1978
29	Tour Guides Act, 1978
30	Occupational Diseases in Mines and Works Amendment Act, 1978
31	Rural Coloured Areas Amendment Act, 1978
32	Registration of Vendors Act, 1978
33	Coloured Development Corporation Amendment Act, 1978
34	Irrigation Districts Adjustment Amendment Act, 1978
35	Part Appropriation Act, 1978
36	Alteration of Provincial Boundaries Act, 1978
37	Railways and Harbours Appropriation Act, 1978
38	National Roads Amendment Act, 1978
39	Post Office Appropriation Act, 1978
40	Pension Laws Amendment Act, 1978
41	Designated Neighbouring Countries Act, 1978
42	Admission of Persons to the Republic Regulation Amendment Act, 1978
43	Group Areas Amendment Act, 1978
44	Mining Rights Amendment Act, 1978
45	National Institute for Metallurgy Amendment Act, 1978
46	Atomic Energy Amendment Act, 1978
47	Wine and Spirit Control Amendment Act, 1978
48	Moratorium Amendment Act, 1978
49	Defence Amendment Act, 1978
50	Nursing Act, 1978
51	Medical Schemes Amendment Act, 1978
52	Medical, Dental and Supplementary Health Service Professions Amendment Act, 1978
53	South African Citizenship Amendment Act, 1978
54	Offices of Profit under the Republic Amendment Act, 1978
55	Financial Relations Amendment Act, 1978
56	Secret Services Account Act, 1978 (before 1993); Secret Services Act, 1978 (after 1993)
57	Patents Act, 1978
58	Prisons Amendment Act, 1978
59	Companies Amendment Act, 1978
60	Estate Agents Amendment Act, 1978
61	Diplomatic Privileges Amendment Act, 1978
62	Merchant Shipping Amendment Act, 1978
63	Civil Aviation Offences Amendment Act, 1978
64	Railways and Harbours Acts Amendment Act, 1978
65	Church Square, Pretoria, Development Amendment Act, 1978
66	Co-ordination of Housing Matters Act, 1978
67	Bantu Education Amendment Act, 1978 (before 1978); Black Education Amendment Act, 1978 (after 1978)
68	University of Durban-Westville Amendment Act, 1978
69	Compulsory Motor Vehicle Insurance Amendment Act, 1978
70	Cape Town Foreshore Amendment Act, 1978
71	University of Stellenbosch (Private) Amendment Act, 1978
72	Potchefstroomse Universiteit vir Christelike Hoër Onderwys (Private) Amendment Act, 1978
73	Water Amendment Act, 1978
74	Sale of Land on Instalments Amendment Act, 1978
75	Regulation of Monopolistic Conditions Amendment Act, 1978
76	Abuse of Dependence-producing Substances and Rehabilitation Centres Amendment Act, 1978
77	National Welfare Amendment Act, 1978
78	Trade Practices Amendment Act, 1978
79	Criminal Procedure Matters Amendment Act, 1978
80	Financial Institutions Amendment Act, 1978
81	Attorneys Amendment Act, 1978
82	Liquor Amendment Act, 1978
83	South African Indian Council Amendment Act, 1978
84	Coloured Persons Representative Council Amendment Act, 1978
85	Standards Amendment Act, 1978
86	Fishing Industry Development Act, 1978
87	Forest Amendment Act, 1978
88	University of the Western Cape Amendment Act, 1978
89	Appropriation Act, 1978
90	Judges' Pensions Act, 1978
91	Judges' Remuneration Act, 1978
92	Deeds Registries Amendment Act, 1978
93	Customs and Excise Amendment Act, 1978
94	Finance Act, 1978
95	Revenue Laws Amendment Act, 1978
96	Electoral Laws Amendment Act, 1978
97	Bantu (Urban Areas) Amendment Act, 1978 (before 1978); Blacks (Urban Areas) Amendment Act, 1978 (after 1978)
98	Copyright Act, 1978
99	Protection of Businesses Act, 1978
100	National Welfare Act, 1978
101	Income Tax Act, 1978
102	Second Bantu Laws Amendment Act, 1978 (before 1978); Second Black Laws Amendment Act, 1978 (after 1978)
103	Sales Tax Act, 1978
104	Bureau for State Security Act, 1978
105	Second Pension Laws Amendment Act, 1978
106	Pensions (Supplementary) Act, 1978
107	Fund-raising Act, 1978
108	University of the Orange Free State (Private) Amendment Act, 1978
109	Publications Amendment Act, 1978
110	Social and Associated Workers Act, 1978 (before 1989); Social Work Act, 1978 (from 1989 to 1999); Social Service Professions Act, 1978 (after 1999)
111	Methodist Church of Southern Africa (Private) Act, 1978

== 1979 ==
Act no.	Short title
1	Perishable Products Export Control Amendment Act, 1979
2	Advertising on Roads and Ribbon Development Amendment Act, 1979
3	National Roads Amendment Act, 1979
4	Railways and Harbours Additional Appropriation Act, 1979
5	Senate Act, 1979
6	Admission of Persons to the Republic Regulation Amendment Act, 1979
7	Departure from the Union Regulation Amendment Act, 1979
8	Workmen's Compensation Amendment Act, 1979
9	Unemployment Insurance Amendment Act, 1979
10	Plant Improvement Amendment Act, 1979
11	Groot Constantia State Estate Control Amendment Act, 1979
12	Subdivision of Agricultural Land Amendment Act, 1979
13	Bethelsdorp Settlement Amendment Act, 1979
14	Patents Amendment Act, 1979
15	Additional Appropriation Act, 1979
16	Laws on Plural Relations and Development Amendment Act, 1979
17	Medicines and Related Substances Control Amendment Act, 1979
18	Health Amendment Act, 1979
19	Dental Technicians Act, 1979
20	Pharmacy Amendment Act, 1979
21	Black Taxation Amendment Act, 1979
22	Post Office Additional Appropriation Act, 1979
23	Dissolution of Marriages on Presumption of Death Act, 1979
24	Pre-Union Statute Laws Revision Act, 1979
25	Admission of Advocates Amendment Act, 1979
26	Slums Amendment Act, 1979
27	Railways and Harbours Appropriation Act, 1979
28	Part Appropriation Act, 1979
29	General Pensions Act, 1979
30	State Oil Fund Amendment Act, 1979
31	Business Names Amendment Act, 1979
32	Archives Amendment Act, 1979
33	Post Office Appropriation Act, 1979
34	Land Surveyors' Registration Amendment Act, 1979
35	National Monuments Amendment Act, 1979
36	Electoral Laws Amendment Act, 1979
37	Trade Marks Amendment Act, 1979
38	Hotels Amendment Act, 1979
39	Indians Education Amendment Act, 1979
40	Indians Advanced Technical Education Amendment Act, 1979
41	Electoral Act for Indians Amendment Act, 1979
42	Defence Amendment Act, 1979
43	Advanced Technical Education Amendment Act, 1979
44	Publications Amendment Act, 1979
45	Electoral Act, 1979
46	Atomic Energy Amendment Act, 1979
47	Uranium Enrichment Amendment Act, 1979
48	Tiger's-Eye Control Amendment Act, 1979
49	Parliamentary Service and Administrators' Pensions Amendment Act, 1979
50	Coloured Persons Education Amendment Act, 1979
51	Water Amendment Act, 1979
52	Universities for Blacks Amendment Act, 1979
53	Attorneys Act, 1979
54	Prisons Amendment Act, 1979
55	Liquor Amendment Act, 1979
56	Criminal Procedure Amendment Act, 1979
57	Coloured Persons Representative Council Amendment Act, 1979
58	Forest Amendment Act, 1979
59	Scientific Research Council Amendment Act, 1979
60	National Parks Amendment Act, 1979
61	Sea Fisheries Amendment Act, 1979
62	Rhodes University (Private) Amendment Act, 1979
63	Judges' Remuneration Amendment Act, 1979
64	Police Amendment Act, 1979
65	Inquests Amendment Act, 1979
66	Judges' Pensions Amendment Act, 1979
67	Agricultural Credit Amendment Act, 1979
68	Land Titles Adjustment Act, 1979
69	Co-operative Societies Amendment Act, 1979
70	Divorce Act, 1979
71	University of Natal (Private) Amendment Act, 1979
72	Petroleum Products Amendment Act, 1979
73	National Supplies Procurement Amendment Act, 1979
74	Second State Oil Fund Amendment Act, 1979
75	Temporary Employees Pension Fund Act, 1979
76	Slums Act, 1979
77	Professional Engineers' Amendment Act, 1979
78	Architects' Amendment Act, 1979
79	Quantity Surveyors' Amendment Act, 1979
80	Railways and Harbours Acts Amendment Act, 1979
81	Carriage by Air Amendment Act, 1979
82	National Institute for Metallurgy Amendment Act, 1979
83	Occupational Diseases in Mines and Works Amendment Act, 1979
84	University of Cape Town (Private) Amendment Act, 1979
85	Cape of Good Hope Savings Bank Society Amendment Act, 1979
86	University of Port Elizabeth (Private) Amendment Act, 1979
87	Promotion of the Density of Population in Designated Areas Act, 1979 (before 1985); Designated Areas Development Act, 1979 (after 1985)
88	State Trust Board Act, 1979
89	Diamond Cutting Act, 1979
90	Education and Training Act, 1979
91	Public Accountants' and Auditors' Amendment Act, 1979
92	Financial Relations Amendment Act, 1979
93	Road Transportation Amendment Act, 1979
94	Industrial Conciliation Amendment Act, 1979
95	In-Service Training Act, 1979
96	Maintenance and Promotion of Competition Act, 1979
97	Second Unemployment Insurance Amendment Act, 1979
98	Laws on Plural Relations and Development Second Amendment Act, 1979
99	Constitution Amendment Act, 1979
100	Pension Laws Amendment Act, 1979
101	Finance Act, 1979
102	Revenue Laws Amendment Act, 1979
103	Financial Institutions Amendment Act, 1979
104	Income Tax Act, 1979
105	Financial Arrangements with Venda Act, 1979
106	Pensions (Supplementary) Act, 1979
107	Status of Venda Act, 1979
108	Information Service of South Africa Special Account Act, 1979
109	Housing Amendment Act, 1979
110	Customs and Excise Amendment Act, 1979
111	Sales Tax Amendment Act, 1979
112	University of Pretoria (Private) Amendment Act, 1979
113	Group Areas Amendment Act, 1979
114	Protection of Businesses Amendment Act, 1979
115	Companies Amendment Act, 1979
116	Fuel Research Institute and Coal Amendment Act, 1979
117	Electricity Amendment Act, 1979
118	Advocate-General Act, 1979 (before 1991); Ombudsman Act, 1979 (after 1991)
119	South African Iron and Steel Industrial Corporation, Limited, Act, 1979
120	Appropriation Act, 1979
