= Promotion of Bantu Self-government Act, 1959 =

Apartheid law in South Africa

Promotion of Bantu Self-Government Act, 1959

Parliament of South Africa
- Long title: Act to provide for the gradual development of self-governing Bantu national units and for direct consultation between the Government of the Union and the said national units in regard to matters affecting the interests of such national units; to amend the Native Administration Act, 1927, the Native Trust and Land Act, 1936, and the Bantu Authorities Act, 1951, and to repeal the Representation of Natives Act, 1936; and to provide for other incidental matters.
- Citation: Act No. 46 of 1959
- Enacted by: Parliament of South Africa
- Royal assent: 17 June 1959
- Commenced: 19 June 1959
- Repealed: 27 April 1994
- Administered by: Minister of Bantu Administration and Development

Repealed by
- Constitution of the Republic of South Africa, 1993

Related legislation
- Bantu Authorities Act, 1951
- Status: Repealed

The Promotion of Bantu Self-Government Act, 1959 (Act No. 46 of 1959, commenced 19 June; subsequently renamed the Promotion of Black Self-government Act, 1959 and later the Representation between the Republic of South Africa and Self-governing Territories Act, 1959) was an important piece of South African apartheid legislation that allowed for the transformation of traditional tribal lands into "fully fledged independent states Bantustans", which would supposedly provide for the right to self-determination of the country's black population. It also resulted in the abolition of parliamentary representation for black South Africans, an act furthered in 1970 with the passage of the Black Homeland Citizenship Act.

== Background ==
The Act was designed to further the policy of so-called Grand Apartheid, meaning the permanent partition of South Africa into national "homelands" for each supposed "people" or nation. In this plan, the Afrikaners (indigenized Dutch) people would control the bulk of the country, while the African population was divided into eight peoples, defined according to language groups, that would have separate nation-states in areas unilaterally demarcated by the white regime. Each black "nation" was then provided with a Commissioner-General, who was entrusted with the development of its assigned Homeland into a fully self-governing state. Blacks were expected to exercise their political rights in these Homeland enclave states, not in the remainder of South Africa where white supremacy would continue and Afrikaner nationalism would be expressed.

== Content of the Act ==
The following is a brief description of the sections of the Promotion of Bantu Self-Government Act, 1959:

=== Definitions and interpretation ===
Section 1

Defines the explanations of keywords in the Act.

Section 2.1

Defines the eight types of Bantu populations.

Section 2.2

Defines the right of the Governor-General to commissioner-generals for each Bantu population type.

Section 2.3

Defines that the rights of the commissioner-generals powers, functions and duties are defined in the Act.

Section 2.4

Defines the commissioner-general employment period as five years or at the pleasure of the Governor-General, not hold another civil service or private position and reside at a place considered acceptable by the minister.

Section 3

Defines the powers, function, and duties of the commissioner-general to represent the government with each Bantu population group or authority.

Section 4.1

Defines the rights of the Minister with approval of the Governor-general to appoint a Bantu person to represent the population type.

Section 4.2

Defines that the representative, after approval from the Governor-general, is the recognised representative for the region.

Section 4.3

Defines the Governor-general's right to withdraw recognition.

Section 5.1

Defines the powers, function and duties of the Bantu representative recognised and appointed under section 4.

Section 5.2

Defines that the representative appoint is deemed to be a headman in relation to the Native Administration Act, 1927 section 2(8).

Section 6

Defines the amendments to the Native Administration Act, 1927 brought about by this Act.

Section 7

Defines the insertions into section 4 of the Native Trust and Land Act, 1936, brought about by this Act, allowing the transfer of land by trusts as well as powers, functions, and duties in the former.

Section 8

Defines the legislative powers of the Bantu authorities.

Section 9

Defines the amendments to the definitions in section 1 in the Bantu Authorities Act 68, 1951.

Section 10

Defines the word amendments in section 2(2) in the Bantu Authorities Act 68, 1951.

Section 11

Defines the word amendments in section 5(1a) and section 7 in the Bantu Authorities Act 68, 1951.

Section 12

Defines text for the new substitution for section 7 in the Bantu Authorities Act 68, 1951.

Section 13

Defines text for the new substitution for section 7bis in the Bantu Authorities Act 68, 1951.

Section 14.1

Defines the ability of the Governor-General to make regulations for the terms of office, remuneration, meeting attendance, etc., for a commissioner-general.

Section 14.2

Defines that regulations may differ from one Bantu population group to the next.

Section 14.3

Defines the penalties, fines or imprisonment for contravening or failing to comply with the said regulations.

Section 15

Defines that the Representation of Natives Act, 1936 is repealed but has no effect on duly elected senators or members of the House of Assembly, between that Act and this acts commencement.

Section 16

Defines the name of the Act.

== Repeal ==
The Act was repealed by the Interim Constitution of South Africa on 27 April 1994.
