= Bantu Authorities Act, 1951 =

Act to give authority to traditional tribal leaders in South Africa

Parliament of South Africa
- Long title: Act to provide for the establishment of certain Bantu authorities and to define their functions, to abolish the Natives Representative Council, to amend the Native Affairs Act, 1920, and the Representation of Natives Act, 1936, and to provide for other incidental matters.
- Citation: Act No. 68 of 1951
- Enacted by: Parliament of South Africa
- Royal assent: 27 June 1951
- Commenced: 17 July 1951
- Repealed: 31 December 2010
- Administered by: Minister of Native Affairs

Repealed by
- Black Authorities Act Repeal Act, 2010
- Status: Repealed

The Bantu Authorities Act, 1951 (Act No. 68 of 1951; subsequently renamed the Black Authorities Act, 1951) was to give authority to Traditional Tribal Leaders within their traditional tribal homelands in South Africa. It also gave the government extensive powers to proclaim these chiefs and councillors, despite the backlash it may receive. This legislation, succeeding the Native Affairs Act (Act No. 23 of 1920), created the legal basis for Self Determination of the various ethnic and linguistic tribes into traditional homeland reserve areas and established tribal, regional and territorial authorities. This Act was augmented by the Bantu Homelands Citizens Act of 1970.

The law established a basis for ethnic government in African homeland reserve areas. All political rights (including voting) held by Africans were restricted to the designated homeland. It was opposed by Africans who rejected government-sponsored 'retribalization'.

Many years after the end of apartheid, and with a new framework for traditional leadership present in South African governance, the act became obsolete. It was formally repealed in 2010, 59 years after it was enacted.

== See also ==
- Apartheid in South Africa
