= Foodstuffs, Cosmetics and Disinfectants Act, 1972 =

South African law

Parliament of South Africa
- Long title: To control the sale, manufacture and importation of foodstuffs, cosmetics and disinfectants; and to provide for incidental matters.
- Citation: Act 54 of 1972
- Territorial extent: South Africa
- Signed: May 19, 1972
- Commenced: January 1, 1973

Amended by
- Foodstuffs, Cosmetics and Disinfectants Amendment Act 32 of 1981; Transfer of Powers and Duties of the State President Act 97 of 1986; Foodstuffs, Cosmetics and Disinfectants Amendment Act 39 of 2007
- Status: In force

The Foodstuffs, Cosmetics and Disinfectants Act 54 of 1972 is a South African law that controls the sale, manufacture, and importation of foodstuffs, cosmetics, and disinfectants to protect public health.

== Purpose ==
To control the sale, manufacture and importation of foodstuffs, cosmetics and disinfectants; and to provide for incidental matters.

== Amendments ==
- Foodstuffs, Cosmetics and Disinfectants Amendment Act 32 of 1981
- Transfer of Powers and Duties of the State President Act 97 of 1986
- Foodstuffs, Cosmetics and Disinfectants Amendment Act 39 of 2007

== Food labelling ==
Food labelling in South Africa is currently governed by Regulation R146 of 2010. It is set to be replaced by Draft Regulation R3337 as the primary food labelling law.
