= Interim Constitution (South Africa) =

Fundamental law of South Africa from 1994 to 1997

Constitution of the Republic of South Africa, 1993

Parliament of South Africa
- Long title: Act to introduce a new Constitution for the Republic of South Africa and to provide for matters incidental thereto.
- Citation: Act No. 200 of 1993
- Enacted by: Parliament of South Africa
- Assented to: 25 January 1994
- Commenced: 27 April 1994
- Repealed: 4 February 1997

Repeals
- Republic of South Africa Constitution Act, 1983; Promotion of Bantu Self-government Act, 1959; Bantu Homelands Citizenship Act, 1970; Bantu Homelands Constitution Act, 1971

Repealed by
- Constitution of the Republic of South Africa, 1996
- Status: Repealed

The Interim Constitution was the fundamental law of South Africa from during the first non-racial general election on 27 April 1994 until it was superseded by the final constitution on 4 February 1997. As a transitional constitution it required the newly elected Parliament to also serve as a constituent assembly to adopt a final constitution. It made provision for a major restructuring of government as a consequence of the abolition of apartheid. It also introduced an entrenched bill of rights against which legislation and government action could be tested, and created the Constitutional Court with broad powers of judicial review.

== History ==
An integral part of the negotiations to end apartheid in South Africa was the creation of a new, non-discriminatory constitution for the country. One of the major disputed issues was the process by which such a constitution would be adopted. The African National Congress (ANC) insisted that it should be drawn up by a democratically elected constituent assembly, while the governing National Party (NP) feared that the rights of minorities would not be protected in such a process, and proposed instead that the constitution be negotiated by consensus between the parties and then put to a referendum.

Formal negotiations began in December 1991 at the Convention for a Democratic South Africa (CODESA). The parties agreed on a process, whereby a negotiated transitional constitution would provide for an elected constitutional assembly to draw up a permanent constitution. The CODESA negotiations broke down, however, after the second plenary session in May 1992. One of the major points of dispute was the size of the supermajority that would be required for the assembly to adopt the constitution: the NP wanted a 75 per cent requirement, which would effectively have given it a veto.

In April 1993, the parties returned to negotiations, in what was known as the Multi-Party Negotiating Process (MPNP). A committee of the MPNP proposed the development of a collection of "constitutional principles" with which the final constitution would have to comply, so that basic freedoms would be ensured and minority rights protected, without overly limiting the role of the elected constitutional assembly. Adopting this idea, the parties to the MPNP drew up the Interim Constitution, which was formally enacted by the apartheid-era Tricameral Parliament due to the National Party demanding legal continuity, and came into force on 27 April 1994.
