= Prohibition of Political Interference Act, 1968 =

Parliament of South Africa
- Long title: Act to prohibit interference by one population group in the politics of any other population group and the receipt by political parties of financial assistance from abroad.
- Citation: Act No. 51 of 1968
- Enacted by: Parliament of South Africa
- Assented to: 29 May 1968
- Commenced: 5 June 1968
- Repealed: 2 July 1985; 29 April 1994

Repealed by
- Constitutional Affairs Amendment Act, 1985; Abolition of Restrictions on Free Political Activity Act, 1993
- Status: Repealed

The Prohibition of Political Interference Act, 1968 (Act No. 51 of 1968, which was also known as the Prohibition of Improper Interference Act, and was later renamed the Prohibition of Foreign Financing of Political Parties Act), was a piece of apartheid legislation in South Africa that sought to prevent racial groups from collaborating with each other for a political purpose. This act is thought to have been enacted by the ruling apartheid government to prevent the strong growth of the Liberal Party of South Africa (LPSA), which was made up of South Africans of various races who were against the racially divisive policies of the Apartheid regime government.

The Liberal Party of South Africa was formed in 1953 when various groups of anti-apartheid activists joined together to form a political party. Initially referred to as the South African Liberation Association, the party sought to repeal racially discriminating legislation and ensure access to health care, quality education, voting rights, and equal human rights for South Africans of all races.

== Consequence of Legislation ==
With the enactment of the act, the Liberal Party, being a multi-racial party, was outlawed and forced to either disband or go underground. The party chose to disband during meetings in April and May 1968 shortly after the enactment of the legislation. The majority of the Members of the party however continued to fight against the Apartheid system until its end in 1994.

The act also prohibited parties from receiving funding or donations from foreign organizations or people.

== Repeal ==
The sections of the act prohibiting multi-racial political parties were repealed (along with several other apartheid laws) by the Constitutional Affairs Amendment Act, 1985; at that time the act was also renamed. The repealing of the Act was as a direct result of increased political and financial pressure on the National Party of South Africa to end its racially divisive policies.

The remaining sections of the act were repealed by the Abolition of Restrictions on Free Political Activity Act, 1993.

== See also ==
- Category:Apartheid laws in South Africa
- Apartheid in South Africa
