= Public Safety Act, 1953 =

Parliament of South Africa
- Long title: Act to make provision for the safety of the public and the maintenance of public order in cases of emergency and for matters incidental thereto.
- Citation: Act No. 3 of 1953
- Enacted by: Parliament of South Africa
- Royal assent: 24 February 1953
- Commenced: 4 March 1953
- Repealed: 6 October 1995
- Administered by: Minister of Justice

Repealed by
- State of Emergency Act, 1995
- Status: Repealed

In 1953, the Public Safety Act was enacted by the apartheid South African government (coming into force 4 March). This Act empowered the government to declare stringent states of emergency and increased penalties for protesting against or supporting the repeal of a law.

This act was passed in response to civil disobedience campaigns by the African National Congress (ANC), in particular the Defiance Campaign of 1952 (instigated by ANC leaders, including Nelson Mandela and Walter Sisulu).

The Act included a provision that empowered the government to declare a state of emergency in any or every part of the country (South West Africa included) and to rule by proclamation. Under Section 3, this power was granted to the Governor General (and later, the State President), and it effectively put no limits on what measures might be taken, or for how long.

Moreover, any law issued during a state of emergency could be made retrospective for four days to cover any emergency action taken by the police. The emergency regulations could suspend any act of Parliament, with a few exceptions. If the justice minister or administrator of South West Africa deemed it necessary, they could declare a state of emergency but the governor general had to approve their action within ten days.

Under a state of emergency, the Minister of Law and Order, the Commissioner of the South African Police (SAP), a magistrate, or a commissioned officer could detain any person for "reasons of public safety". The Public Safety Act, further provided for detention without trial for any dissent.

== Repeal ==
The Act was repealed by the State of Emergency Act No 86 of 1995.

== See also ==
- Category:Apartheid laws in South Africa
- Apartheid in South Africa
