= Indemnity Act, 1977 =

Parliament of South Africa
- Long title: Act to indemnify the State, members of the Executive Council of the Republic, persons in the service of the State and persons acting under their authority in respect of acts, announcements, statements or information advised, commanded, ordered, directed, done, made or published in good faith for the prevention, suppression or termination of internal disorder or the maintenance or restoration of good order or public safety or essential services or the preservation of life or property in any part of the Republic, and to provide for matters connected therewith.
- Citation: Act No. 13 of 1977
- Enacted by: Parliament of South Africa
- Assented to: 8 March 1977
- Commenced: 16 March 1977
- Status: Spent

The Indemnity Act no. 13 of 1977 (Commencement 16 March) of South Africa was enacted following the suppression of the violence by the South African Police and apartheid supporters during the Soweto uprising on 16 June 1976. This uprising was by the black youths of Soweto protesting against the forced Afrikaans medium decree in schools.

With retrospective effect between 16 June 1976 and 16 March 1977, this Act indemnified the government, its officers, and all other persons acting under their authority in respect of acts done, orders given or information provided in good faith for the prevention or suppression of internal disorder, the maintenance or restoration of good order, public safety or essential services, or the preservation of life or property in any part of the Republic.

The Act reads as follows:

ACT To indemnify the State, members of the Executive Council of the Republic, persons in the service of the State and persons acting under their authority in respect of acts, announcements, statements or information advised, commanded, ordered, directed, done, made or published in good faith for the prevention, suppression or termination of internal disorder or the maintenance or restoration of good order or public safety or essential services or the preservation of life or property in any part of the Republic, and to provide for matters connected therewith.

— Government Gazette, Indemnity Act, 1977
