= General Law Amendment Act, 1963 =

Parliament of South Africa
- Long title: Act to amend the Magistrates' Courts Act, 1944, the Suppression of Communism Act, 1950, the Criminal Procedure Act, 1955, the Post Office Act, 1958, and the Unlawful Organizations Act, 1960, and to provide for the detention of certain persons for interrogation, for declaring certain places or areas to be protected places or areas, and for other incidental matters.
- Citation: Act No. 37 of 1963
- Enacted by: Parliament of South Africa
- Assented to: 1 May 1963
- Commenced: 2 May 1963
- Repealed: 2 July 1982

Repealed by
- Internal Security Act, 1982
- Status: Repealed

The General Law Amendment Act, number 37 of 1963 (commenced 2 May), commonly known as the 90-Day Detention Law, allowed a South African police officer to detain without warrant a person suspected of a politically motivated crime for up to 90 days without access to a lawyer. When used in practice, suspects were re-detained for another 90-day period immediately after release.

The Amendment Act also introduced the so-called "Sobukwe Clause" which allowed people already convicted of political offenses to be further detained (initially for twelve months). It is often called the Sobukwe Clause because it was used to keep PAC leader Robert Mangaliso Sobukwe (who was originally arrested in 1960 and sentenced to three years) in Robben Island for an additional six years.

This Act strengthened previous amendments by further defining political crimes under Apartheid. Section 5 of the Act made a capital crime out of "receiving training that could further the objects of communism or advocating abroad economic or social change in South Africa by violent means through the aid of a foreign government or institution where the accused is a resident or former resident of South Africa".

The legislation made provisions for imposing "sentences ranging from a minimum of five years imprisonment to death for anyone leaving the country to learn sabotage techniques, for advocating the forcible overthrow of the government or for urging the forcible intervention in domestic South African affairs by an outside power, including the UN".

== Further expansion of Act ==
The act was amended by the General Law Amendment Act No 80 of 1964 which allowed the Minister of Justice of Apartheid South Africa to extend the "Sobukwe Clause" as desired.

== Repeal ==
The act was repealed by the Internal Security Act, 1982, which, however, gave the government similar powers of detention.

== See also ==
- Category:Apartheid laws in South Africa
- Apartheid in South Africa
