= Coloured Persons Communal Reserves Act, 1961 =

South African law of the apartheid era

Parliament of South Africa
- Long title: Act to apply the Mission Stations and Communal Reserves Act, 1909, of the Cape of Good Hope, to coloured persons settlement areas within the meaning of the Coloured Persons Settlement Areas (Cape) Act, 1930, to repeal the latter Act and to provide for matters incidental thereto.
- Citation: Act No. 3 of 1961
- Enacted by: Parliament of South Africa
- Royal assent: 28 February 1961
- Commenced: 1 December 1961
- Repealed: 30 June 1991

Repealed by
- Abolition of Racially Based Land Measures Act, 1991
- Status: Repealed

The Coloured Persons Communal Reserves Act of 1961, was an Apartheid South Africa piece of legislation, which was enacted to apply the Mission Stations and Communal Reserves Act 1909, of the Cape of Good Hope, to coloured persons settlement areas within the meaning of the Coloured Persons Settlement Areas (Cape) Act, 1930, to repeal the latter Act and to provide for matters incidental thereto.

This Act further strengthened racial segregation legislation of South Africa during the Apartheid regime.

== Key Effect of Legislation ==
The Coloured Persons Communal Rerserves Act, had the effect of lowering wages by denying Africans rights within urban areas and by keeping their families and dependants on subsistence plots in the reserves.

== Repeal ==
The act was repealed by the Abolition of Racially Based Land Measures Act, 1991 on 30 June 1991.

== See also ==
- Category:Apartheid laws in South Africa
- Apartheid in South Africa
