= Indemnity Act, 1961 =

Parliament of South Africa
- Long title: Act to indemnify the Government, its officers and all other persons acting under its or their authority in respect of acts, announcements, statements or information advised, commanded, ordered, directed, done, made or published in good faith for the prevention or suppression of internal disorder or the maintenance or restoration of good order or public safety or essential services or the preservation of life or property in any part of South Africa included in the Republic or the termination of a state of emergency in certain areas included in the Republic, and to provide for matters incidental thereto.
- Citation: Act No. 61 of 1961
- Enacted by: Parliament of South Africa
- Assented to: 28 June 1961
- Commenced: 5 July 1961
- Status: Spent

The Indemnity Act 61 of 1961 was a law enacted by the apartheid government in South Africa, which protected the government from any legal repercussions of the Sharpeville massacre and other violent events that followed. It prevented the courts from hearing any criminal charges or civil claims against the government, its leaders or its employees for actions taken between 21 March 1960 and 5 July 1961.

The act indemnified the State President, the Cabinet, all members of the civil service, the defence force, the police force, the railways and harbours service, the prison service, and anyone else acting under their direction. It applied to any actions taken, orders given, or information published "in good faith" between the specified dates to protect public order, essential services, life or property.

The act was precipitated by 224 civil claims for damages, amounting to approximately £400,000 (R800,000), served against the Minister of Justice in September 1960 by victims of Sharpeville and their relatives. All these claims were nullified by the act. In response to public pressure, the government set up a committee to examine the claims and to recommend ex gratia payments, but few were actually paid out.

The act remains on the statute-books, although any claims to which it would apply would have been prescribed (expired). It is also inconsistent with the modern Constitution of South Africa, which guarantees the right of access to the courts. The South African Law Reform Commission has recommended that it should be repealed.
