= Preservation of Coloured Areas Act, 1961 =

South African law of the apartheid era

Preservation of Coloured Areas Act, Act No 31 of 1961

Parliament of South Africa
- Citation: Act No. 31 of 1961
- Enacted by: Parliament of South Africa
- Royal assent: 28 February 1961
- Commenced: 1 December 1961
- Repealed: 30 June 1991

Repealed by
- Rural Coloured Areas Act, 1963
- Status: Repealed

The Preservation of Coloured Areas Act of 1961, was an Apartheid South Africa piece of legislation. It was ostensibly enacted to prevent land in coloured areas from being taken without compensation to the owner even if the owner had not registered his claim. It further entrenched "Coloured Areas" in the law.

The Act was to apply the Mission Stations and Communal Reserves Act 1909, of the Cape of Good Hope, to coloured persons settlement areas within the meaning of the Coloured Persons Settlement Areas (Cape) Act, 1930, to repeal the latter Act and to provide for matters incidental thereafter.

This act further strengthened racial segregation legislation of South Africa during the Apartheid regime. This in turn also help further consolidate the laws surrounding recruiting, employment, accommodation, feeding and health conditions of Black labourers. This effect would later on be reinforced by the Black Labour Act No 67 of 1965.

== Repeal ==
The act was replaced two years later by the Rural Coloured Areas Act, 1963.

== See also ==
- Category:Apartheid laws in South Africa
- Apartheid in South Africa
