= Urban Bantu Councils Act, 1961 =

Parliament of South Africa
- Long title: Act to provide for the establishment of urban Bantu councils, the conferring on certain Bantu of civil and criminal jurisdiction in urban areas, the establishment of community guards in certain areas, and matters incidental thereto, and to amend the Natives (Urban Areas) Consolidation Act, 1945.
- Citation: Act No. 79 of 1961
- Enacted by: Parliament of South Africa
- Assented to: 30 June 1961
- Commenced: 7 July 1961
- Repealed: 29 July 1977
- Administered by: Minister of Bantu Administration and Development

Repealed by
- Community Councils Act, 1977
- Status: Repealed

The Urban Bantu Councils Act, Act No 79 of 1961, formed part of the apartheid system of racial segregation in South Africa. It replaced the Advisory Boards created earlier by the Natives Urban Areas Act of 1923, and permitted democratic election of new municipal councils with African chairmen which were assigned some administrative duties.
