= Aliens Control Act, 1973 =

South African government act

Parliament of South Africa
- Long title: Act to amend the provisions of the Aliens Act, 1937, so as to prohibit the performance of certain acts in co-operation with or in respect of certain aliens; so as to provide for the issuing of temporary permits to certain persons; and so as to provide for the imposition of certain penalties on second or subsequent convictions of offences under that Act; to amend the provisions of the Admission of Persons to the Republic Regulation Act, 1972, so as to provide for the exemption of certain categories of persons from the provisions of section 13 (1) (a) of the latter Act; to amend section 43 of the latter Act so as to substitute a reference to section 51 for a reference to section 52; and so as to apply the provisions of section 13 (1) of the latter Act in respect of certain persons convicted in any country of certain offences; and to provide for incidental matters.
- Citation: Act No. 40 of 1973
- Enacted by: Parliament of South Africa
- Assented to: 16 May 1973
- Commenced: 23 May 1973
- Repealed: 1 October 1991

Repealed by
- Aliens Control Act, 1991
- Status: Repealed

The Aliens Control Act No 40 of 1973 of South Africa exempted the racial group of Indians from the need to obtain permits for travel between provinces. However, in terms of provincial legislation at the time, Indians were not allowed to stay in the Orange Free State and parts of northern Natal for more than a brief period unless prior permission had been obtained.

== Repeal ==
The laws prohibiting Indians from residing in the Orange Free State and northern Natal, from which the Aliens Control Act had granted an exemption, were themselves repealed in 1986.

The act was repealed by section 60 of the Aliens Control Act, 1991. The 1991 Act allowed any police officer to declare a person suspected of being an illegal immigrant in South Africa a "prohibited person" and to deport them. By the mid-1990s, it was regarded as "possibly the ugliest leftover from apartheid" for continuing to favor white over non-white immigration.
