= Extension of University Education Act, 1959 =

South African law

Parliament of South Africa
- Long title: Act to provide for the establishment, maintenance, management and control of university colleges for non-white persons; for the admission of students to and their instruction at university colleges; for the limitation of the admission of non-white students to certain university institutions; and for other incidental matters.
- Citation: Act No. 45 of 1959
- Enacted by: Parliament of South Africa
- Royal assent: 11 June 1959
- Commenced: 21 June 1959
- Repealed: 30 June 1988

Repealed by
- Tertiary Education Act, 1988
- Status: Repealed

The Extension of University Education Act, Act 45 of 1959, formed part of the apartheid system of racial segregation in South Africa. This act made it a criminal offense for a non-white student to register at a formerly open university without the written permission of the Minister of Internal Affairs. New universities were then established for various non-white groups.

== Background ==
Prior to the passing of the University Education Act, in 1958, students classified as Black, Asian, or Coloured accounted for only 17% of the students in white universities. From 1959 there were few options for non-whites. The University of Fort Hare was open to Xhosa speakers, the University of Natal's medical school was given an exemption to admit only non-whites and University of South Africa (UNISA), a correspondence university, was open to all races. The emphasis now was also to separate the non-whites, classifying them to universities based on certain ethnic groups. New universities were opened.

The University of the Western Cape (1959) was established in Bellville for coloureds, the University of Zululand (1960) at Ngoye was created in Zululand for Zulus. The University College for Indians (1972) was established at Durban in Natal Province after the establishment of University College for Indians in 1961, the University of the North (1959) at Turfloop in the Transvaal for the Sotho-Tswanans, while Fort Hare, the former Lovedale Mission College, became "Lovedale College" and restricted to Xhosas.

By 1974, the legislation had achieved what it had intended and only 2% of students registered in the country were attending a university that was not of their own ethnicity. Apartheid also extended to staffing, with white academics employed only at white universities but staffing mixed at non-white universities.

Because of the Bantustan policy of Apartheid, the newly established Black homelands needed their own universities but usually affiliated to an existing Black university inside South Africa. The University of Transkei opened in 1976, University of Venda (1982) and the University of Bophuthatswana (1978). In the urban areas of South Africa proper, further Black higher educational institutions were opened to cater for the increasing population such as the Medical University of South Africa outside Pretoria in 1976 and the Vista University in Soweto in 1983.

In 1979, the laws governing ethnicity at Black universities was abolished and students could attend any Black university. In 1985, universities were allowed to enrol any race at their educational facilities.

== Repeal ==
The act was repealed by the Tertiary Education Act, 1988.
