= Mines and Works Act =

Apartheid law in South Africa

Mines and Works Act, 1956

Parliament of South Africa
- Long title: To consolidate and amend the laws relating to the operating of mines and works and of machinery used in connection therewith.
- Citation: Act No. 27 of 1956
- Enacted by: Parliament of South Africa
- Royal assent: 2 May 1956
- Commenced: 4 May 1956

Amended by
- General Law Third Amendment Act 129 of 1993; Amended by Transfer of Powers and Duties of the State President Act 97 of 1986; Amended by General Law Amendment Act 62 of 1973; Amended by General Law Amendment Act 80 of 1971

The Mines and Works Act was a piece of legislation in South Africa, originally passed in 1911, amended in 1912 and 1926 before undergoing further changes in 1956 and 1959. This act legally established South Africa's employment "colour bar." and was enacted to establish the duties and responsibilities of workers in Mines and Works in South Africa.

== Colour Bar Act reference ==
This act (with/without/or its amendments) is sometimes referred to as the Colour Bar or the Colour Bar Act. The term colour bar, however, usually refers to a group of labor practices, informal trade union practices, government regulations, and legislation, all of which were developed over time to prevent blacks from competing for certain categories of jobs monopolized by whites.

== Original 1911 act ==
The Mines and Works Act, 1911 (Act No. 12 of 1911) included various regulations which gave "white workers a monopoly of skilled operations". However, the act did not specify that Black South Africans should be discriminated against in any way. Indeed, it made no mention of race or colour. Nor did it specifically and clearly give the government Mining Engineer powers to introduce a legal colour bar. But under section 4(n) it gave the Governor-General powers to grant, cancel and suspend certificates of competency to mine managers, mine overseers, mine surveyors, mechanical engineers, engine-drivers and miners entitled to blast. It also gave them the power to decide which other occupations should be required to possess certificates of competency.

== Mines and Works Regulations, 1912 ==
Some or other commission had criticized mine managements for employing large numbers of unskilled whites 'often entirely ignorant of mining, and whose principal and often only recommendation is their physical fitness and their suitability for rough work'. Yet when the commission reported in 1910, it submitted draft regulations that were heavy with colour bars. Some appeared in the interpretation of terms, as when the words 'white person' were inserted in the definition of banksman, onsetter, ganger and mine manager. Some took the form of an injunction to employ only whites in specified occupations, such as blasting, running elevators, driving engines, supervising boilers and other machinery; or as shift boss and mine overseer. Furthermore, only whites would be allowed to obtain the certificates of competence required, for instance, by engine drivers and boiler attendants. With some modifications, these draft regulations served as model for the Mines and Works Regulations, 1912.

== Mines and Works Amendment Act, 1926 ==
In contrast to the 1912 regulations, the Mines and Works Amendment Act, 1926 (Act No. 25 of 1926) bracketed Coloured with whites in a position of privilege. For there was no question of segregating the coloured who spoke the Afrikaner's language, shared his outlook and stood closer to one than to the black population. Furthermore, the key section of this act "stated that the minister, before announcing regulations for issuing certificates of competency (including the key blasting certificate, for nearly a century of license of the white miner), should seek the advice of the owners and of the organizations whose members hold a majority of the certificates, that is, the white unions, including the Mine Worker's Union. He was to do this through the formation of advisory committees." This act was further revised in 1956 to deal with the declaration of work in the national interest.

== Mines and Works Act, 1956 ==
The following is a brief description of the sections of the Mines and Works Act, 1956:

Section 1

Defines the meaning of certain keywords in the Act.

Section 2

Defines the appointment of a government mining engineer, inspectors of mines, machinery, and explosives by the governor-general.

Section 3

Defines the inspectors powers appointed in section 2, the right to enter mines or works at any time, powers granted to improve bad practice, and the appeal process of inspectors decisions via the government mining engineer.

Section 4

Defines the jurisdiction of inspectors to try certain offences, issue and collect fines, and the appeal process against findings or sentences.

Section 5

Defines the inspections rights and procedures concerning holding inquiries into accidents and other matters.

Section 6

Defines rights of the inspector, with regards to section 4 and 5, to summon witnesses to give evidence and production of documents, conduct cross-examination, issue fines for failing to attend, comply or disrupt inquiries, administer oaths with the laws for perjury applying to testimony.

Section 7

Defines it as punishable offence to obstruct or to deliberately fail to assist the inspector or officials.

Section 8

Defines the government mining engineers right to grant persons the right to drive and use connecting tunnels, shafts, inclines or excavations on any persons land, and that persons duties to the land owner where permission has been granted.

Section 9

Defines the conditions permitting work on mines and works with regard to the restrictions to work on Sundays, Christmas Day, and Good Friday.

Section 10

Defines the of hours of employment for mines and works and the provisions and exemptions of when those hours can be overworked.

Section 11

Defines the age restrictions for employing juveniles under sixteen and females.

Section 12

Defines the type of regulations the governor-general can make for proper workings of mines, works and their management, granting and removal of certificates of competency to persons other than black workers. Make different regulations for provinces, districts, individual mines and works.

Section 13

Defines the abilities of mines and works managers to make special rules for order and discipline as long they were not inconsistent with Act, the rules for publishing the special rules and defines what happens if disobeyed. Defines the procedure to objecting to them and the Minister's automatic right to disallow any rules created or have them modified.

Section 14

Defines the penalties for fraudulent certificates of competency.

Section 15

Defines the penalties for endangering safety or causing serious bodily injury.

Section 16

Defines the offences that are not expressly provided for.

Section 17

Defines the penalties that are not expressly provided for.

Section 18

Defines increased penalties for conviction under section 13 concerning safety and endangerment violations, penalties from section 15 apply.

Section 19

Defines the increased jurisdiction of magistrates' courts.

Section 20

Defines the repeal of sub-section (2) the Mines and Works Act, 1911 (Act No. 12 of 1911), the Mines and Works Act, 1911, Amendment Act, 1926 (Act No. 25 of 1926), the Mines and Works (Amendment) Act, 1931 (Act No. 22 of 1931), and the Mines and Works (Amendment) Act, 1934 (Act No.5 of 1934)

Section 21

Defined the name of the Act.

== See also ==
- Category:Apartheid laws in South Africa
- Apartheid in South Africa
