= Group Areas Development Act, 1955 =

Part of the apartheid system of racial segregation in South Africa

Parliament of South Africa
- Long title: Act to provide for the control of the disposal and for the acquisition of immovable property in group areas and other areas defined under the Group Areas Act, 1950, and for the proper development of such areas, and for the said purposes to establish a board and to define its functions, and to provide for matters incidental thereto.
- Citation: Act No. 69 of 1955
- Enacted by: Parliament of South Africa
- Royal assent: 24 June 1955
- Commenced: 1 February 1956
- Repealed: 17 February 1966
- Administered by: Minister of the Interior

Repealed by
- Community Development Act, 1966

Related legislation
- Group Areas Act, 1950
- Status: Repealed

The Group Areas Development Act, 1955 (Act No. 69 of 1955; subsequently renamed the Community Development Act, 1955), formed part of the apartheid system of racial segregation in South Africa. It was enacted to help effect the purpose of the Group Areas Act of 1950, namely to exclude non-Whites from living in the most developed areas, which were restricted to Whites. It was later replaced by the Community Development Act of 1966.

== Content of the Act ==
The following is a brief description of the sections of the Natives Resettlement Act:

Section 1

Defined the meanings of common words within the Act.

Section 2

Defined the name of the Board as the Group Areas Development Board and in the legal form of a body corporate. It would also be liable for no tax.

Section 3

Defined the Board size as no more than six members and chairman appointed by the Governor-General. A member each was nominated by the Minister of Interior, Finance, Native Affairs and Land.

Section 4

Defines the length of time of a Board member's tenure and what grounds terminate that tenure.

Section 5

Defines the Boards meeting times, the quorum sizes, voting and conflict of interest procedures.

Section 6

Defined how the remuneration of the board members was established.

Section 7

Defined the establishment of an executive committee consisting of the chairman and two board members that performed the daily functions of the Board based on the direction and review by the board.

Section 8

Defined the penalties for bribery and fraud committed by members or officers and for disclosing the work of the Board to others without consent.

Section 9

Defined the staffing of the Board and the appointment of a secretary and chief administrative officer.

Section 10

Defined how the Board would be funded by the Minister of Finance.

Section 11

Defined the Auditor-General right to audit the Board's accounts annually.

Section 12

Defined the objectives of the Board is to assist in and to control the disposal of affected properties in group areas, to develop such areas and to assist persons to acquire or hire in group areas immovable property in relation to which they are not qualified persons. This included all aspects of town planning, house building, leasing of land for own-builds and financing through grants or loans. Included would be a register of all immovable property held.

Section 13

Defined the delegation of powers by the board and its ability to enter in agreements with other bodies such as local authorities.

Section 14

Defined the Board's requirement to submit a yearly report to the Minister of Interior and parliament.

Section 15

Defined the Board's duty to record all affected properties description, owner, occupier and value of land and buildings. This list was open to public viewing and could be amended when properties were added or disposed.

Section 16

Defined the preemptive right of the Board over affected properties and when it laps as in-regard to section 20.

Section 17

Defined the transfer of affected properties on the list in section 15 which necessitated the notification of the property owner and Registrar of deeds.

Section 18

Defines the procedure if an affected property is altered or extended or new buildings added after date the property had been affected by the Board.

Section 19

Defines the procedure for determining the value of a property. Value of the property by it Owner and Board would be presented to a Valuer and after that, the Valuer would then determine the value for the Board and the former's decision would be final.

Section 20

Defines the procedures if an owner of an immovable property intends to dispose of an affected property in a place proclaimed in the Group Areas Act.

Section 21

Defined the Board's appreciation contribution it could claim in the event when compensation was paid, exceeded the basic value of the property.

Section 22

Defined the procedures and payment to the Board if the affected immovable property is sold after the basic date.

Section 23

Defined the procedures of the Board if the affected property is removed from the list.

Section 24

Defined the Boards ability to acquire immovable property by agreement or by expropriation.

Section 25

Defined the procedure as to how the Board would expropriate land or buildings which included serving notice which would describe the land in detail and requiring the owner to state what the amount the land was worth. It describes how the notice will be served and the length of time until expropriation as being thirty days.

Section 26

Defined the duties and procedures of the Board, Registrar of Deeds, Mortgagee and Owners once immovable property has been expropriated.

Section 27

Defined what the procedure would be if the owner failed to agree to the compensation for expropriated property in section 25 and the use of arbitrators as defined in section 31.

Section 28

Defined the payment of compensation to owners and the procedure if the owner cannot be found

Section 29

Defined the registration of expropriated property of the Board by the Registrar of Deeds.

Section 30

Defined the formation of a Group Areas Account and how credits and debits of money would be managed.

Section 31

Defines the appointment of three arbitrators by a provincial administrator if, after sixty days from expropriation, the land owner does not agree with the amount paid for his land.

Section 32

Defined the procedure for determining the value of land and buildings.

Section 33

Defined the Board's exemption from rates for immovable property it personally owned.

Section 34

Defined the procedure to obtain appreciation contributions owed to the Board in the event of insolvency.

Section 35

Defined the chairman's ability to appoint inspectors and details the rights of those inspectors to enter premises, question occupants, request and inspect ownership documents. It also defines the use of interpreters and for legal purposes be regarded as an inspector.

Section 36

Defined the regulations the Minister of Interior could make in relation to the Act and how they place before Parliament for approval.

Section 37

Defined the penalties for furnishing false statements or documents, impersonating an Inspector, obstructs or interferes with an Inspector or Valuer or fails to comply with section 26.

Section 38

Defined how the Act would apply to areas proclaimed via the Government Gazette.

Section 39

Defined the name of the Act and when it comes into operation.
