= Bantu Homelands Citizenship Act, 1970 =

Denaturalization law passed during the apartheid era of South Africa

Parliament of South Africa
- Long title: Act to provide for citizenship of certain Bantu homelands and for the issue of certificates of citizenship to Bantu persons; in connection therewith to amend certain laws; and to provide for incidental matters.
- Citation: Act No. 26 of 1970
- Enacted by: Parliament of South Africa
- Assented to: 3 March 1970
- Commenced: 26 March 1970
- Repealed: 27 April 1994
- Administered by: Minister of Bantu Administration and Development

Repealed by
- Constitution of the Republic of South Africa, 1993
- Status: Repealed

The Bantu Homelands Citizenship Act, 1970 (Act No. 26 of 1970; subsequently renamed the Black States Citizenship Act, 1970 and the National States Citizenship Act, 1970) was a denaturalization law passed during the apartheid era of South Africa that allocated various tribes/nations of black South Africans as citizens of their traditional black tribal "homelands," or Bantustans.

== Content of the Act ==
The following is a brief description of the sections of the Bantu Homelands Citizenship Act of 1970:

=== Definitions and interpretation ===
Section 1

Defines the explanations of keywords in the Act.

Section 2.1

Defines that there is a citizenship for every homeland or self-governing territory.

Section 2.2

Defines that every Black person in the Republic, if not already classified to a homeland or self-governing territory, shall be a citizen of one of these homelands or self-governing territory.

Section 2.3

Defines that a person classified to a particular homeland or self-governing territory has the right to vote there.

Section 2.4

Defines that even though a person is a citizen of a particular homeland or self-governing territory, they were still a citizen of the Republic in relation to international law.

Section 2.5

Defines that duties, obligation or responsibilities of a person classified to a homeland or self-governing territory are not relieved of except what is described by the Act.

Section 3

Defines the citizenship procedures of a Black person is currently in a homeland or self-governing territory.

Section 4

Defines the loss of citizenship of one homeland or self-governing territory if they become a citizen of another.

Section 5

Defines that a Black people in a homeland or self-governing territory shall be entitled to a citizenship certificate.

Section 6

Defines that the certificate would be issued to any Black person who is a citizen of a homeland or self-governing territory, a provisional certificate issue if a full certificate can't be issued immediately and that requirements be made known by whatever means to Black people in the Republic

Section 7

Defines the forms, photographs, and information required to be issued a certificate as well as what homeland or self-governing territory they belonged too.

Section 8

Defines the need for two photographs for certificate to be issued, one of which would remain with the records officer.

Section 9

Defines the rights of a Black person to object to the Minster's officer if he believes his citizenship has been misclassified as could a territories authority to a Black person's classification. The Ministers officer's final decision was binding except if it was appealed to a Minister and was changed.

Section 10.1

Defines the penalties, fines, or imprisonment for using someone else's certificate as one's own; not keeping it safe from others; forges or alters it; having a forgery or alteration; prints or produces a document; issues a document without authority; incorrect records information and make false statements.

Section 10.2

Defines the rights, after conviction of person for offence under section 10(1)(b and d), to confiscate the instruments uses to forge and reproduce a document or citizenship certificate, except in the case where the owner of those instruments did not know what they were being used for.

Section 10.3

Defines what sections of Criminal Procedures Act applies to confiscations detailed in section 10(2)(b).

Section 11.1

Defines the power of the State President to make regulations that are required by the Act, including the issuance of certificates, taking of fingerprints, issuing duplicate certificates, fees payable and transmission of records to the Black Reference Bureau, provisional certificate or documents, size of photographs and anything else to obtain the objectives of the Act

Section 11.2

Defines that the powers conferred in section 11(1)(h) are not limited by the other paragraphs of this section

Section 11.3

Defines that different regulations may made from one Black population group, etc, to the next.

Section 11.4

Defines the penalties, fines or imprisonment for contravening or failing to comply with the said regulations

Section 12

Defines the amendment of section 13(1) of the Population Registration Act 30 of 1950 with the text of this section.

Section 13

Defines the amendment of section 14(1) of the Population Registration Act 30 of 1950 with the text of this section, rights, and duties of a peace officer to have a person furnish them with their full name and address.

Section 14

Defines that section 7 of the Bantu Authorities Act 68 of 1951 be amended with the removal and addition of the word "and" at the end of (f) and (g) and the addition of a new section (h), which defines the ability to issue certificates of citizenship.

Section 15

Defines that section 11 of the Bantu (Abolition of Passes and Co-ordination of Documents) Act 67 of 1952 be substituted with the text of this section, which defines the establishment of a Bantu Reference Bureau.

Section 16

Defines that section 8 of the Transkei Constitution Act 48 of 1963 be substituted with the text of this section, defining the loss of citizenship if the citizen of the Transkei becomes a citizen of another country or Homeland.

Section 17

Defines the name of the Act.

== Repealed ==
The act was repealed on 27 April 1994 by the Interim Constitution of South Africa.

== See also ==
- Promotion of Bantu Self-Government Act
- History of South African Nationality
