= List of acts of the Parliament of South Africa, 1980–1989 =

This is a list of acts of the Parliament of South Africa enacted in the years 1980 to 1989.

South African acts are uniquely identified by the year of passage and an act number within that year. Some acts have gone by more than one short title in the course of their existence; in such cases each title is listed with the years in which it applied.

== 1980 ==
Act no.	Short title
1	Additional Appropriation Act, 1980
2	Borders of Particular States Extension Act, 1980
3	Laws on Co-operation and Development Amendment Act, 1980
4	Fertilizers, Farm Feeds, Agricultural Remedies and Stock Remedies Amendment Act, 1980
5	Plant Breeders' Rights Amendment Act, 1980
6	Marketing Amendment Act, 1980
7	Wine, Other Fermented Beverages and Spirits Amendment Act, 1980
8	Expropriation Amendment Act, 1980
9	Lake Areas Development Amendment Act, 1980
10	Part Appropriation Act, 1980
11	Housing Amendment Act, 1980
12	Community Development Amendment Act, 1980
13	Period of Office of Members of the South African Indian Council Extension Act, 1980
14	Railways and Harbours Additional Appropriation Act, 1980
15	Coloured Persons Education Amendment Act, 1980
16	National Road Safety Amendment Act, 1980
17	Railways and Harbours Appropriation Act, 1980
18	Post Office Appropriation Act, 1980
19	Regulation of Functions of Officers in the Public Service Act, 1980
20	Land Bank Amendment Act, 1980
21	Finance Act, 1980
22	Prisons Amendment Act, 1980
23	Compulsory Motor Vehicle Insurance Amendment Act, 1980
24	South African Coloured Persons Council Act, 1980
25	Human Sciences Research Amendment Act, 1980
26	South African Tourist Corporation Amendment Act, 1980
27	Agricultural Credit Amendment Act, 1980
28	Republic of South Africa Constitution Third Amendment Act, 1980
29	Admission of Persons to the Republic Regulation Amendment Act, 1980
30	South African Citizenship Amendment Act, 1980
31	Republic of South Africa Constitution Second Amendment Act, 1980
32	Provincial Powers Extension Act, 1980
33	Prevention of Illegal Squatting Amendment Act, 1980
34	Financial Relations Amendment Act, 1980
35	Population Registration Amendment Act, 1980
36	Coloured Development Corporation Amendment Act, 1980
37	University of the Witwatersrand, Johannesburg, (Private) Amendment Act, 1980
38	Abortion and Sterilization Amendment Act, 1980
39	Anatomical Donations and Post-Mortem Examinations Amendment Act, 1980
40	Homeopaths, Naturopaths, Osteopaths and Herbalists Amendment Act, 1980
41	Fund-raising Amendment Act, 1980
42	Medical Schemes Amendment Act, 1980
43	Medical, Dental and Supplementary Health Service Professions Amendment Act, 1980
44	Deeds Registries Amendment Act, 1980
45	State Attorney Amendment Act, 1980
46	Supreme Court Amendment Act, 1980
47	Judges' Remuneration Amendment Act, 1980
48	Liquor Amendment Act, 1980
49	Rand Afrikaans University (Private) Amendment Act, 1980
50	Police Amendment Act, 1980
51	Sundays River Settlement Regulation of Control Act, 1980
52	Education and Training Amendment Act, 1980
53	South African Mutual Life Assurance Society (Private) Amendment Act, 1980
54	Sectional Titles Amendment Act, 1980
55	Trade Practices Amendment Act, 1980
56	Copyright Amendment Act, 1980
57	Estate Agents Amendment Act, 1980
58	Maintenance and Promotion of Competition Amendment Act, 1980
59	Share Blocks Control Act, 1980
60	Mining Titles Registration Amendment Act, 1980
61	Precious Stones Amendment Act, 1980
62	Boxing and Wrestling Control Amendment Act, 1980
63	Heraldry Amendment Act, 1980
64	Aviation Amendment Act, 1980
65	Railway Construction Act, 1980
66	National Roads Amendment Act, 1980
67	Railways and Harbours Acts Amendment Act, 1980
68	State Oil Fund Amendment Act, 1980
69	State Trust Board Amendment Act, 1980
70	Republic of South Africa Constitution Amendment Act, 1980
71	Public Service Amendment Act, 1980
72	Public Holidays Amendment Act, 1980
73	Dumping at Sea Control Act, 1980
74	Republic of South Africa Constitution Fourth Amendment Act, 1980
75	Credit Agreements Act, 1980
76	Attorneys Amendment Act, 1980
77	Defence Amendment Act, 1980
78	Insolvency Amendment Act, 1980
79	Taxation of Blacks Amendment Act, 1980
80	Radio Amendment Act, 1980
81	Egg Production Control Amendment Act, 1980
82	Second Police Amendment Act, 1980
83	Occupational Diseases in Mines and Works Amendment Act, 1980
84	Companies Amendment Act, 1980
85	Electricity Amendment Act, 1980
86	Armaments Development and Production Amendment Act, 1980
87	Wine and Spirits Amendment Act, 1980
88	Black Labour (Transfer of Functions) Act, 1980
89	Electoral Amendment Act, 1980
90	Limitation and Disclosure of Finance Charges Amendment Act, 1980
91	Road Transportation Amendment Act, 1980
92	Water Amendment Act, 1980
93	Pensions (Supplementary) Act, 1980
94	Laws on Co-operation and Development Second Amendment Act, 1980
95	Industrial Conciliation Amendment Act, 1980
96	Industrial Development Amendment Act, 1980
97	Pension Laws Amendment Act, 1980
98	Customs and Excise Amendment Act, 1980
99	Financial Institutions Amendment Act, 1980
100	Second Finance Act, 1980
101	Republic of South Africa Constitution Fifth Amendment Act, 1980
102	National Key Points Act, 1980
103	Appropriation Act, 1980
104	Income Tax Act, 1980
105	Sales Tax Amendment Act, 1980
106	Revenue Laws Amendment Act, 1980

== 1981 ==
Act no.	Short title
1	Unemployment Insurance Amendment Act, 1981
2	Marine Traffic Act, 1981
3	Merchant Shipping Amendment Act, 1981
4	Civil Aviation Offences Amendment Act, 1981
5	Explosives Amendment Act, 1981
6	Prevention and Combating of Pollution of the Sea by Oil Act, 1981 (before 1997); Marine Pollution (Control and Civil Liability) Act, 1981 (after 1997)
7	Atomic Energy Amendment Act, 1981
8	Tiger's-Eye Control Amendment Act, 1981
9	Indians Education Amendment Act, 1981
10	Education and Training Amendment Act, 1981
11	Culture and Education Laws Amendment Act, 1981
12	Sectional Titles Amendment Act, 1981
13	National Monuments Amendment Act, 1981
14	Plant Breeders' Rights Amendment Act, 1981
15	Canned Fruit Export Marketing Amendment Act, 1981
16	Electoral Act for Indians Amendment Act, 1981
17	Defence Special Account Amendment Act, 1981
18	Subdivision of Agricultural Land Amendment Act, 1981
19	Fund-raising Amendment Act, 1981
20	Medicines and Related Substances Control Amendment Act, 1981
21	Atmospheric Pollution Prevention Amendment Act, 1981
22	Tweefontein Timber Company Limited Act, 1981
23	Mineral Laws Supplementary Act Amendment Act, 1981
24	Workmen's Compensation Amendment Act, 1981
25	Commission for Fresh Produce Markets Amendment Act, 1981
26	Land Survey Amendment Act, 1981
27	Technikons (Education and Training) Act, 1981
28	Magistrates' Courts Amendment Act, 1981
29	Railways and Harbours Acts Amendment Act, 1981
30	Railway Construction Act, 1981
31	Hazardous Substances Amendment Act, 1981
32	Foodstuffs, Cosmetics and Disinfectants Amendment Act, 1981
33	Health Amendment Act, 1981
34	Railways and Harbours Additional Appropriation Act, 1981
35	Electoral Amendment Act, 1981
36	Financial Institutions Amendment Act, 1981
37	Additional Appropriation Act, 1981
38	Mental Health Amendment Act, 1981
39	Part Appropriation Act, 1981
40	Republic of South Africa Constitution Amendment Act, 1981
41	Precious Stones Amendment Act, 1981
42	South African Iron and Steel Industrial Corporation, Limited, Amendment Act, 1981
43	Prisons Amendment Act, 1981
44	Black Administration Amendment Act, 1981
45	Marriage Amendment Act, 1981
46	Regulation of Functions of Officers in the Public Service Amendment Act, 1981
47	Police Amendment Act, 1981
48	Wage Amendment Act, 1981
49	Railways and Harbours Part Appropriation Act, 1981
50	Post Office Part Appropriation Act, 1981
51	Environment Planning Amendment Act, 1981
52	Judges' Remuneration Amendment Act, 1981
53	Unauthorized Expenditure (1979–1980) Act, 1981
54	Unit Trusts Control Act, 1981
55	Participation Bonds Act, 1981
56	Manpower Training Act, 1981
57	Labour Relations Amendment Act, 1981
58	Second Wage Amendment Act, 1981
59	National Road Safety Amendment Act, 1981
60	Second Railways and Harbours Acts Amendment Act, 1981
61	Second Railway Construction Act, 1981
62	Guidance and Placement Act, 1981
63	Aviation Amendment Act, 1981
64	Road Transportation Amendment Act, 1981
65	South African Transport Services Act, 1981
66	Medical, Dental and Supplementary Health Service Professions Amendment Act, 1981
67	Pension Laws Amendment Act, 1981
68	Alienation of Land Act, 1981
69	Electoral Act for Indians Second Amendment Act, 1981
70	South African Indian Council Amendment Act, 1981
71	Nursing Amendment Act, 1981
72	Medical Schemes Amendment Act, 1981
73	Agricultural Credit Amendment Act, 1981
74	Post Office Appropriation Act, 1981
75	Post Office Amendment Act, 1981
76	Mountain Catchment Areas Amendment Act, 1981
77	Borders of Particular States Extension Amendment Act, 1981
78	Aliens Amendment Act, 1981
79	University of Durban-Westville Amendment Act, 1981
80	Railways and Harbours Appropriation Act, 1981
81	Export Credit Re-insurance Amendment Act, 1981
82	Training Centres for Coloured Cadets Repeal Act, 1981
83	Companies Amendment Act, 1981
84	Mineral Technology Act, 1981
85	Occupational Diseases in Mines and Works Amendment Act, 1981
86	Mining Rights Amendment Act, 1981
87	Foreign States Immunities Act, 1981
88	Land Bank Amendment Act, 1981
89	Water Amendment Act, 1981
90	Administration of Estates Amendment Act, 1981
91	Co-operatives Act, 1981
92	Fund-raising Second Amendment Act, 1981
93	National Roads Amendment Act, 1981
94	Repeal of Laws Act, 1981
95	South African Citizenship Amendment Act, 1981
96	Income Tax Act, 1981
97	Sales Tax Amendment Act, 1981
98	South African Reserve Bank Amendment Act, 1981
99	Revenue Laws Amendment Act, 1981
100	Finance Act, 1981
101	Republic of South Africa Constitution Second Amendment Act, 1981
102	Financial Relations Amendment Act, 1981
103	Powers and Privileges of the President's Council Act, 1981
104	Technical Colleges Act, 1981
105	South African Teachers' Council for Whites Amendment Act, 1981
106	Vista University Act, 1981
107	Members of the Coloured Persons Representative Council Pensions Amendment Act, 1981
108	Members of the South African Indian Council Pensions Amendment Act, 1981
109	Appropriation Act, 1981
110	Status of Ciskei Act, 1981
111	Laws on Co-operation and Development Amendment Act, 1981
112	Small Business Development Act, 1981
113	Second Unemployment Insurance Amendment Act, 1981
114	Customs and Excise Amendment Act, 1981
115	Pensions (Supplementary) Act, 1981
116	Attorneys Amendment Act, 1981
117	Liquor Amendment Act, 1981
118	Financial Arrangements with Ciskei Act, 1981

== 1982 ==
Act no.	Short title
1	Unemployment Insurance Amendment Act, 1982
2	Compulsory Motor Vehicle Insurance Amendment Act, 1982
3	Merchant Shipping Amendment Act, 1982
4	Aviation Amendment Act, 1982
5	National Roads Amendment Act, 1982
6	South African Transport Services Amendment Act, 1982
7	Railway Construction Act, 1982
8	Rand Water Board Statutes (Private) Act Amendment Act, 1982
9	Tweefontein Timber Company Limited Amendment Act, 1982
10	Water Research Amendment Act, 1982
11	Vaal River Development Scheme Amendment Act, 1982
12	Forest Amendment Act, 1982
13	National Parks Amendment Act, 1982
14	Universities for Blacks Amendment Act, 1982
15	Precious Stones Amendment Act, 1982
16	Educational Services Amendment Act, 1982
17	Legal Deposit of Publications Act, 1982
18	Agricultural Credit Amendment Act, 1982
19	Veterinary and Para-Veterinary Professions Act, 1982
20	Agricultural Produce Agency Sales Amendment Act, 1982
21	Expropriation Amendment Act, 1982
22	Heraldry Amendment Act, 1982
23	Valuers' Act, 1982
24	Transport Services Additional Appropriation Act, 1982
25	National Education Policy Amendment Act, 1982
26	Community Development Amendment Act, 1982
27	Deeds Registries Amendment Act, 1982
28	Housing Amendment Act, 1982
29	Companies Amendment Act, 1982
30	Standards Act, 1982
31	National Supplies Procurement Amendment Act, 1982
32	Hotels Amendment Act, 1982
33	Share Blocks Control Amendment Act, 1982
34	Financial Relations Amendment Act, 1982
35	Births, Marriages and Deaths Registration Amendment Act, 1982
36	Laws of the Coloured Persons Representative Council Application Act, 1982
37	Health Amendment Act, 1982
38	Medical, Dental and Supplementary Health Service Professions Amendment Act, 1982
39	Pharmacy Amendment Act, 1982
40	Sales Tax Amendment Act, 1982
41	Part Appropriation Act, 1982
42	Public Accountants' and Auditors' Amendment Act, 1982
43	Prevention of Corruption Amendment Act, 1982
44	Succession Amendment Act, 1982
45	Police Amendment Act, 1982
46	Additional Appropriation Act, 1982
47	South African Medical Research Council Amendment Act, 1982
48	Abortion and Sterilization Amendment Act, 1982
49	Architects' Amendment Act, 1982
50	Quantity Surveyors' Amendment Act, 1982
51	Labour Relations Amendment Act, 1982
52	Peninsula Technikon Act, 1982
53	Estate Agents Amendment Act, 1982
54	Transport Services Appropriation Act, 1982
55	Natural Scientists' Act, 1982
56	Armaments Development and Production Amendment Act, 1982
57	Post Office Appropriation Act, 1982
58	Electricity Amendment Act, 1982
59	Magistrates' Courts Amendment Act, 1982
60	Attorneys Amendment Act, 1982
61	Broadcasting Amendment Act, 1982
62	Group Areas Amendment Act, 1982
63	Associated Health Service Professions Act, 1982 (before 1993); Chiropractors, Homeopaths and Allied Health Service Professions Act, 1982 (from 1993 to 2001); Allied Health Professions Act, 1982 (after 2001)
64	Criminal Procedure Amendment Act, 1982
65	Prisons Amendment Act, 1982
66	State Land Disposal Amendment Act, 1982
67	Second Agricultural Credit Amendment Act, 1982
68	Second Community Development Amendment Act, 1982
69	Abattoir Industry Amendment Act, 1982
70	Nursing Amendment Act, 1982
71	Demonstrations in or near Court Buildings Prohibition Act, 1982
72	Intimidation Act, 1982
73	Judges' Remuneration Amendment Act, 1982
74	Internal Security Act, 1982
75	Second Railway Construction Act, 1982
76	Black Transport Services Amendment Act, 1982
77	Transport Services for Coloured Persons and Indians Amendment Act, 1982
78	Road Transportation Amendment Act, 1982
79	Transport Services Unauthorized Expenditure Act, 1982
80	Post Office Amendment Act, 1982
81	Pension Laws Amendment Act, 1982
82	Financial Institutions Amendment Act, 1982
83	Laws on Co-operation and Development Amendment Act, 1982
84	Protection of Information Act, 1982
85	Public Service Amendment Act, 1982
86	Customs and Excise Amendment Act, 1982
87	Revenue Laws Amendment Act, 1982
88	Manpower Training Amendment Act, 1982
89	Second Unemployment Insurance Amendment Act, 1982
90	Second Sales Tax Amendment Act, 1982
91	Income Tax Act, 1982
92	Nuclear Energy Act, 1982
93	Rand Afrikaans University (Private) Amendment Act, 1982
94	University of Stellenbosch (Private) Amendment Act, 1982
95	Appropriation Act, 1982
96	Finance Act, 1982
97	Referendums Act, 1982
98	Registration of Newspapers Amendment Act, 1982
99	Constitution Amendment Act, 1982
100	Environment Conservation Act, 1982
101	Population Registration Amendment Act, 1982
102	Black Local Authorities Act, 1982
103	Defence Amendment Act, 1982
104	Elections Amendment Act, 1982
105	Appeals Amendment Act, 1982
106	Pensions (Supplementary) Act, 1982

== 1983 ==
Act no.	Short title
1	Manpower Training Amendment Act, 1983
2	Labour Relations Amendment Act, 1983
3	Basic Conditions of Employment Act, 1983
4	Compulsory Motor Vehicle Insurance Amendment Act, 1983
5	Marine Traffic Amendment Act, 1983
6	Machinery and Occupational Safety Act, 1983
7	Transport Services Additional Appropriation Act, 1983
8	Road Transportation Amendment Act, 1983
9	Perishable Products Export Control Act, 1983
10	National Roads Amendment Act, 1983
11	Additional Post Office Appropriation Act, 1983
12	Public Accountants' and Auditors' Amendment Act, 1983
13	South African Transport Services Amendment Act, 1983
14	Part Appropriation Act, 1983
15	Additional Appropriation Act, 1983
16	Conditions of Employment (South African Transport Services) Act, 1983
17	South African Transport Services Finances and Accounts Act, 1983
18	Explosives Amendment Act, 1983
19	Arms and Ammunition Amendment Act, 1983
20	Pharmacy Amendment Act, 1983
21	Health Amendment Act, 1983
22	Transport Services Appropriation Act, 1983
23	National Parks Amendment Act, 1983
24	Police Amendment Act, 1983
25	Borders of Particular States Extension Amendment Act, 1983
26	Post Office Appropriation Act, 1983
27	Post Office Amendment Act, 1983
28	Education and Culture Laws Amendment Act, 1983
29	Forest Amendment Act, 1983
30	Abolition of the Fuel Research Institute Act, 1983
31	Scientific Research Council Amendment Act, 1983
32	Coal Act, 1983
33	Sea Fisheries Amendment Act, 1983
34	Defence Amendment Act, 1983
35	Culture Promotion Act, 1983
36	Agricultural Pests Act, 1983
37	Dairy Industry Amendment Act, 1983
38	Plant Breeders' Rights Amendment Act, 1983
39	Plan Improvement Amendment Act, 1983
40	Land Bank Amendment Act, 1983
41	Electoral Amendment Act, 1983
42	Agricultural Credit Amendment Act, 1983
43	Conservation of Agricultural Resources Act, 1983
44	Wine and Spirit Control Amendment Act, 1983
45	Environment Conservation Amendment Act, 1983
46	Rural Coloured Areas Amendment Act, 1983
47	Coloured Farmers Assistance Amendment Act, 1983
48	Technikons (Education and Training) Amendment Act, 1983
49	Bethelsdorp Settlement Amendment Act, 1983
50	Mining Rights Amendment Act, 1983
51	Alienation of Land Amendment Act, 1983
52	Inquests Amendment Act, 1983
53	Courts of Justice Amendment Act, 1983
54	Animals Protection Amendment Act, 1983
55	Advocate-General Amendment Act, 1983
56	Attorneys Amendment Act, 1983
57	Computer Evidence Act, 1983
58	Travel Agents and Travel Agencies Act, 1983
59	Criminal Law Amendment Act, 1983
60	South African Iron and Steel Industrial Corporation, Limited, Amendment Act, 1983
61	Liquor Amendment Act, 1983
62	Maintenance and Promotion of Competition Amendment Act, 1983
63	Housing Amendment Act, 1983
64	Community Development Amendment Act, 1983
65	Human Tissue Act, 1983
66	Copyright Amendment Act, 1983
67	Patents Amendment Act, 1983
68	University of Port Elizabeth (Private) Amendment Act, 1983
69	Rhodes University (Private) Amendment Act, 1983
70	University of Cape Town (Private) Amendment Act, 1983
71	University of Natal (Private) Amendment Act, 1983
72	Indecent or Obscene Photographic Matter Amendment Act, 1983
73	Professional Engineers' Amendment Act, 1983
74	Child Care Act, 1983
75	Property Time-sharing Control Act, 1983
76	Disposal of Common Pasturage Areas Act, 1983
77	Sectional Titles Amendment Act, 1983
78	University of the Western Cape Act, 1983
79	Second National Roads Amendment Act, 1983
80	Transport Services Unauthorized Expenditure Act, 1983
81	University of Durban-Westville Act, 1983
82	Fund-raising Amendment Act, 1983
83	Universities Amendment Act, 1983
84	Advanced Technical Education Amendment Act, 1983
85	Coloured Persons Education Amendment Act, 1983
86	Administration of Estates Amendment Act, 1983
87	Physical Planning Amendment Act, 1983
88	Provincial Affairs Act, 1983
89	Customs and Excise Amendment Act, 1983
90	Rand Water Board Statutes (Private) Amendment Act, 1983
91	Promotion of Local Government Affairs Act, 1983
92	Revenue Laws Amendment Act, 1983
93	Finance Act, 1983
94	Income Tax Act, 1983
95	Sales Tax Amendment Act, 1983
96	Pension Laws Amendment Act, 1983
97	Pensions (Supplementary) Act, 1983
98	Appropriation Act, 1983
99	Universities and Technikons Advisory Council Act, 1983
100	South African Tourism Board Act, 1983
101	Insolvency Amendment Act, 1983
102	Laws on Co-operation and Development Amendment Act, 1983
103	Second Attorneys Amendment Act, 1983
104	Prisons Amendment Act, 1983
105	Admiralty Jurisdiction Regulation Act, 1983
106	Occupational Diseases in Mines and Works Amendment Act, 1983
107	Rand Afrikaans University (Private) Amendment Act, 1983
108	Referendums Act, 1983
109	Borders of Particular States Extension Second Amendment Act, 1983
110	Republic of South Africa Constitution Act, 1983
111	Second Pensions (Supplementary) Act, 1983

== 1984 ==
Act no.	Short title
1	Aviation Amendment Act, 1984
2	Health Amendment Act, 1984
3	Mental Health Amendment Act, 1984
4	Black Communities Development Act, 1984
5	South African Transport Services Act, 1984
6	Education and Heraldry Laws Amendment Act, 1984
7	Trade Practices Amendment Act, 1984
8	Import and Export Control Amendment Act, 1984
9	Sugar Amendment Act, 1984
10	Inventions Development Amendment Act, 1984
11	Prescription Amendment Act, 1984
12	Administration of Estates Amendment Act, 1984
13	John Dunn (Distribution of Land) Amendment Act, 1984
14	Trade Metrology Amendment Act, 1984
15	Share Blocks Control Amendment Act, 1984
16	Price Control Amendment Act, 1984
17	South African Teachers' Council for Whites Amendment Act, 1984
18	Removal of Restrictions Amendment Act, 1984
19	Town and Regional Planners Act, 1984
20	Community Development Amendment Act, 1984
21	Sea-shore Amendment Act, 1984
22	Additional Post Office Appropriation Act, 1984
23	Public Service Amendment Act, 1984
24	Part Appropriation Act, 1984
25	Government Villages Amendment Act, 1984
26	Wage Amendment Act, 1984
27	Basic Conditions of Employment Amendment Act, 1984
28	Additional Appropriation Act, 1984
29	Workmen's Compensation Amendment Act, 1984
30	Income Tax Amendment Act, 1984
31	Livestock Improvement Amendment Act, 1984
32	Abattoir Industry Amendment Act, 1984
33	Subdivision of Agricultural Land Amendment Act, 1984
34	Transport Services Appropriation Act, 1984
35	Animal Diseases Act, 1984
36	National Building Regulations and Building Standards Amendment Act, 1984
37	Post Office Amendment Act, 1984
38	Inspection of Financial Institutions Act, 1984
39	Financial Institutions (Investment of Finds) Act, 1984
40	Professional Land Surveyors' and Technical Surveyors' Act, 1984 (before 1993); Professional and Technical Surveyors' Act, 1984 (after 1993)
41	Post Office Appropriation Act, 1984
42	Electoral Act Amendment Act, 1984
43	South African Citizenship Amendment Act, 1984
44	National Key Points Amendment Act, 1984
45	Public Investment Commissioners Act, 1984
46	Corporation for Public Deposits Act, 1984
47	South African Reserve Bank Amendment Act, 1984
48	Public Accountants' and Auditors' Amendment Act, 1984
49	Aliens and Immigration Laws Amendment Act, 1984
50	Standards Amendment Act, 1984
51	Estate Agents Amendment Act, 1984
52	Copyright Amendment Act, 1984
53	Industrial Development Amendment Act, 1984
54	Small Business Development Amendment Act, 1984
55	Judges' Remuneration Amendment Act, 1984
56	Magistrates' Courts Amendment Act, 1984
57	Liquor Amendment Act, 1984
58	Medical, Dental and Supplementary Health Service Professions Amendment Act, 1984
59	Medical Schemes Amendment Act, 1984
60	Admission of Advocates Amendment Act, 1984
61	Small Claims Courts Act, 1984
62	Deeds Registries Amendment Act, 1984
63	Wine and Spirits Amendment Act, 1984
64	Scientific Research Council Amendment Act, 1984
65	Commission for Administration Act, 1984 (before 1994); Public Service Commission Act, 1984 (after 1994)
66	Marketing Amendment Act, 1984
67	Local Authorities Loans Fund Act, 1984
68	Police Amendment Act, 1984
69	Close Corporations Act, 1984
70	Companies Amendment Act, 1984
71	Protection of Businesses Amendment Act, 1984
72	Housing Amendment Act, 1984
73	State Oil Fund Amendment Act, 1984
74	Education and Training Amendment Act, 1984
75	Universities, National Education Policy and Technikons Amendment Act, 1984
76	National Policy for General Education Affairs Act, 1984
77	Technikons (Education and Training) Amendment Act, 1984
78	Indians Education Amendment Act, 1984
79	Rating of State Property Act, 1984
80	Promotion of the Density of Population in Designated Areas Amendment Act, 1984
81	Labour Relations Amendment Act, 1984
82	Scientific Research Council Act, 1984
83	Laws on Co-operation and Development Amendment Act, 1984
84	Insolvency Amendment Act, 1984
85	South African Law Commission Amendment Act, 1984
86	Financial Institutions Amendment Act, 1984
87	Defence Amendment Act, 1984
88	Matrimonial Property Act, 1984
89	Customs and Excise Amendment Act, 1984
90	Provincial Powers Amendment Act, 1984
91	University Staff (Education and Training) Act, 1984
92	Tertiary Education (Education and Training) Act, 1984
93	Second South African Transport Services Amendment Act, 1984
94	Payment of Members of Parliament Amendment Act, 1984
95	Powers and Privileges of Parliament Amendment Act, 1984
96	Water Amendment Act, 1984
97	University of the Orange Free State (Private) Amendment Act, 1984
98	Appropriation Act, 1984
99	Sales Tax Amendment Act, 1984
100	Exchequer and Audit Amendment Act, 1984
101	Group Areas Amendment Act, 1984
102	National Policy for General Housing Matters Act, 1984
103	Population Registration and Elections Amendment Act, 1984
104	Physical Planning Amendment Act, 1984
105	Constitution Amendment Act, 1984
106	Human Tissue Amendment Act, 1984
107	Parliamentary and Provincial Medical Aid Scheme Amendment Act, 1984
108	Attorneys Amendment Act, 1984
109	Criminal Procedure Matters Amendment Act, 1984
110	Justices of the Peace and Commissioners of Oaths Amendment Act, 1984
111	Public Service Act, 1984
112	Members of Parliament and Political Office-bearers Pension Scheme Act, 1984
113	Finance Act, 1984
114	Financial Relations Amendment Act, 1984
115	Remuneration of Town Clerks Act, 1984
116	Promotion of Local Government Affairs Amendment Act, 1984
117	Local Government Bodies Franchise Act, 1984
118	Revenue Laws Amendment Act, 1984
119	State President's Committee on National Priorities Act, 1984
120	Revenue Accounts Financing Act, 1984
121	Income Tax Act, 1984
122	Forest Act, 1984
123	Pension Laws Amendment Act, 1984
124	Pensions (Supplementary) Act, 1984
125	Paarl Mountain Amendment Act, 1984
The Republic of South Africa Constitution Act, 1983, came into force on 3 September 1984; elections were held for the new Houses of Representatives and Delegates, while the existing House of Assembly continued without an election.

== 1985 ==
Act no.	Short title
1	Stock Exchanges Control Act, 1985
2	Provincial Powers Extension Amendment Act, 1985
3	Financial Relations Amendment Act, 1985
4	Jan Kempdorp Amendment Act, 1985
5	Police Amendment Act, 1985
6	Prisons Amendment Act, 1985
7	Valuers' Amendment Act, 1985
8	Architects' Amendment Act, 1985
9	Credit Agreements Amendment Act, 1985
10	Estate Agents Amendment Act, 1985
11	International Convention for Safe Containers Act, 1985
12	Maintenance and Promotion of Competition Amendment Act, 1985
13	Professional Engineers' Amendment Act, 1985
14	Coal Amendment Act, 1985
15	Atmospheric Pollution Prevention Amendment Act, 1985
16	Mental Health Amendment Act, 1985
17	Agricultural Pests Amendment Act, 1985
18	Supreme Court Amendment Act, 1985
19	Magistrates' Courts Amendment Act, 1985
20	Animals Protection Amendment Act, 1985
21	Nuclear Energy Amendment Act, 1985
22	Part Appropriation Act of the Administration: House of Assembly, 1985
23	Part Appropriation Act of the Administration: House of Representatives, 1985
24	Part Appropriation Act of the Administration: House of Delegates, 1985
25	Merchant Shipping Amendment Act, 1985
26	Alteration of Provincial Boundaries Act, 1985
27	Post Office Service Amendment Act, 1985
28	University Staff (Education and Training) Amendment Act, 1985
29	Companies Amendment Act, 1985
30	South African Iron and Steel Industrial Corporation, Limited, Amendment Act, 1985
31	Liquor Amendment Act, 1985
32	Additional Appropriation Act, 1985
33	Additional Appropriation Act of the Administration: House of Assembly, 1985
34	Additional Appropriation Act of the Administration: House of Representatives, 1985
35	Additional Appropriation Act of the Administration: House of Delegates, 1985
36	Electoral and Related Affairs Amendment Act, 1985
37	Part Appropriation Act, 1985
38	Transport Services Appropriation Act, 1985
39	Diplomatic Privileges Amendment Act, 1985
40	Post Office Appropriation Act, 1985
41	Local Government Training Act, 1985
42	Co-operatives Amendment Act, 1985
43	Advertising on Roads and Ribbon Development Amendment Act, 1985
44	South African Transport Services Amendment Act, 1985
45	Promotion of Local Government Affairs Amendment Act, 1985
46	State Oil Fund Amendment Act, 1985
47	National Key Points Amendment Act, 1985
48	Foreign States Immunities Amendment Act, 1985
49	Trade Practices Amendment Act, 1985
50	Electricity Amendment Act, 1985
51	Public Accountants' and Auditors' Amendment Act, 1985
52	Black Communities Development Amendment Act, 1985
53	Control of Access to Public Premises and Vehicles Act, 1985
54	Development Trust and Land Amendment Act, 1985
55	Rhodes' Will (Groote Schuur Devolution) Amendment Act, 1985
56	National Libraries Act, 1985
57	Universities and Technikons Advisory Council Amendment Act, 1985
58	National Roads Amendment Act, 1985
59	Prevention and Combating of Pollution of the Sea by Oil Amendment Act, 1985
60	Coal Resources Act, 1985
61	Petroleum Products Amendment Act, 1985
62	Appropriation Act of the Administration: House of Delegates, 1985
63	Appropriation Act of the Administration: House of Assembly, 1985
64	Indians Education Amendment Act, 1985 (House of Delegates)
65	Human Sciences Research Amendment Act, 1985
66	Appropriation Act of the Administration: House of Representatives, 1985
67	Public Service Laws Amendment Act, 1985
68	Social and Associated Workers Amendment Act, 1985
69	Pharmacy Amendment Act, 1985
70	Health Amendment Act, 1985
71	Universities for Blacks, Technikons (Education and Training) and Education and Training Amendment Act, 1985
72	Immorality and Prohibition of Mixed Marriages Amendment Act, 1985
73	Appropriation Act, 1985
74	South African Police Special Account Act, 1985
75	Railway Construction Act, 1985
76	Coloured Persons Education Amendment Act, 1985 (House of Representatives)
77	Natural Scientists' Amendment Act, 1985
78	Share Blocks Control Amendment Act, 1985
79	Finance Act, 1985
80	Attorneys Amendment Act, 1985
81	Revenue Laws Amendment Act, 1985
82	Saint Andrew's College, Grahamstown, (Private) Amendment Act, 1985 (House of Assembly)
83	University of Stellenbosch (Private) Amendment Act, 1985 (House of Assembly)
84	Animals Protection Second Amendment Act, 1985
85	Judges' Pensions Amendment Act, 1985
86	Judges' Remuneration Amendment Act, 1985
87	Supreme Court Second Amendment Act, 1985
88	Second Finance Act, 1985
89	Land Bank Amendment Act, 1985
90	Laws on Co-operation and Development Second Amendment Act, 1985
91	Laws on Co-operation and Development Amendment Act, 1985
92	Physical Planning Amendment Act, 1985
93	Water Research Amendment Act, 1985
94	Second Railway Construction Act, 1985
95	Payment of Members of Parliament Amendment Act, 1985
96	Income Tax Act, 1985
97	Bible Society of South Africa Amendment Act, 1985
98	Members of Parliament and Political Office-bearers Pension Scheme Amendment Act, 1985
99	Powers and Privileges of Parliament and the Constitution Amendment Act, 1985
100	Pensions (Supplementary) Act, 1985
101	Customs and Excise Amendment Act, 1985
102	Sales Tax Amendment Act, 1985
103	Development and Housing Act, 1985 (House of Assembly)
104	Constitutional Affairs Amendment Act, 1985
105	Pension and Related Matters Amendment Act, 1985
106	Financial Institutions Amendment Act, 1985
107	Rules Board for Courts of Law Act, 1985
108	Associated Health Service Professions Amendment Act, 1985
109	Regional Services Councils Act, 1985
110	Local Government Affairs Amendment Act, 1985

== 1986 ==
Act no.	Short title
1	Carriage of Goods by Sea Act, 1986
2	International Convention for the Prevention of Pollution from Ships Act, 1986 (before 1996); Marine Pollution (Prevention of Pollution from Ships) Act, 1986 (after 1996)
3	Universities and Technikons for Blacks, Tertiary Education (Education and Training) and Education and Training Amendment Act, 1986
4	Convention on Agency in the International Sale of Goods Act, 1986
5	Maintenance and Promotion of Competition Amendment Act, 1986
6	Part Appropriation Act, 1986
7	Post Office Amendment Act, 1986
8	National Study Loans and Bursaries Act Repeal Act, 1986
9	"Woordeboek van die Afrikaanse Taal" Amendment Act, 1986
10	National Policy for General Education Affairs Amendment Act, 1986
11	War Graves and National Monuments Amendment Act, 1986
12	Liquor Amendment Act, 1986
13	Part Appropriation Act (House of Assembly), 1986
14	Part Appropriation Act (House of Representatives), 1986
15	Part Appropriation Act (House of Delegates), 1986
16	Additional Post Office Appropriation Act, 1986
17	Additional Appropriation Act, 1986
18	National Welfare Amendment Act (House of Representatives), 1986
19	Additional Appropriation Act (House of Representatives), 1986
20	Additional Appropriation Act (House of Delegates), 1986
21	Additional Appropriation Act (House of Assembly), 1986
22	Public Service Amendment Act, 1986
23	South African Tourist Corporation Amendment Act, 1986
24	Wattle Bark Industry Amendment Act, 1986
25	Statistics Amendment Act, 1986
26	Transport Services Appropriation Act, 1986
27	Unemployment Insurance Amendment Act, 1986
28	Post Office Appropriation Act, 1986
29	Economic Co-operation Promotion Loan Fund Amendment Act, 1986
30	Unemployment Insurance Second Amendment Act, 1986
31	Companies Amendment Act, 1986
32	Stock Theft Amendment Act, 1986
33	Criminal Procedure Amendment Act, 1986
34	Special Courts for Blacks Abolition Act, 1986
35	Administration of Estates Amendment Act, 1986
36	Justices of the Peace and Commissioners of Oaths Amendment Act, 1986
37	Professional Land Surveyors' and Technical Surveyors' Amendment Act, 1986
38	Close Corporations Amendment Act, 1986
39	Copyright Amendment Act, 1986
40	Estate Agents Amendment Act, 1986
41	Marriages, Births and Deaths Amendment Act, 1986
42	Limitation and Disclosure of Finance Charges Amendment Act, 1986
43	National Parks Amendment Act, 1986
44	Patents Amendment Act, 1986
45	Public Accountants' and Auditors' Amendment Act, 1986
46	South African Transport Services Amendment Act, 1986
47	Agricultural Pests Amendment Act, 1986
48	Community Development Amendment Act, 1986
49	Housing Amendment Act, 1986
50	Financial Institutions Amendment Act, 1986
51	Appropriation Act (House of Assembly), 1986
52	Customs and Excise Amendment Act, 1986
53	Matters concerning Admission to and Residence in the Republic Amendment Act, 1986
54	Electricity Amendment Act, 1986
55	Appropriation Act (House of Delegates), 1986
56	Diamonds Act, 1986
57	Laws on Development Aid Amendment Act, 1986
58	Black Local Authorities Amendment Act, 1986
59	Broadcasting Amendment Act, 1986
60	Publications Amendment Act, 1986
61	Appropriation Act (House of Representatives), 1986
62	Precious Stones Amendment Act, 1986
63	Appropriation Act, 1986
64	Payment of Members of Parliament Amendment Act, 1986
65	Income Tax Act, 1986
66	Internal Security Amendment Act, 1986
67	Public Safety Amendment Act, 1986
68	Abolition of Influx Control Act, 1986
69	Provincial Government Act, 1986
70	Sales Tax Amendment Act, 1986
71	Revenue Laws Amendment Act, 1986
72	Identification Act, 1986
73	Restoration of South African Citizenship Act, 1986
74	Black Communities Development Amendment Act, 1986
75	Abolition of Development Bodies Act, 1986
76	Judges' Remuneration Amendment Act, 1986
77	Finance Act, 1986
78	Regional Services Councils Amendment Act, 1986
79	Promotion of Local Government Affairs Amendment Act, 1986
80	Joint Executive Authority for KwaZulu and Natal Act, 1986
81	Mutual Building Societies Amendment Act, 1986
82	Building Societies Act, 1986
83	Transfer of the South African Railways Police Force to the South African Police Act, 1986
84	Motor Vehicle Accidents Act, 1986
85	South African Certification Council Act, 1986
86	Universities Amendment Act, 1986
87	Temporary Removal of Restrictions on Economic Activities Act, 1986
88	Certification Council for Technikon Education Act, 1986
89	Technikons (National Education) Amendment Act, 1986
90	Sheriffs Act, 1986
91	Matrimonial Property Amendment Act, 1986
92	Small Claims Courts Amendment Act, 1986
93	Land Bank Amendment Act, 1986
94	South African Mint and Coinage Amendment Act, 1986
95	Sectional Titles Act, 1986
96	Remuneration of Town Clerks Amendment Act, 1986
97	Transfer of Powers and Duties of the State President Act, 1986
98	Probation Services Act (House of Assembly), 1986
99	Rhodes University (Private) Amendment Act, 1986 (House of Assembly)
100	Education Amendment Act (House of Delegates), 1986
101	Abuse of Dependence-producing Substances and Rehabilitation Centres Amendment Act, 1986
102	Pensions (Supplementary) Act (House of Assembly), 1986
103	National Education Policy Amendment Act (House of Assembly), 1986
104	Private Schools Act (House of Assembly), 1986
105	Laws on Development Aid Second Amendment Act, 1986
106	Pension Laws Amendment Act, 1986
107	Board of Trade and Industry Act, 1986 (before 1992); Board on Tariffs and Trade Act, 1986 (after 1992)
108	Taxation Laws Amendment Act, 1986
109	Pensions (Supplementary) Act, 1986
110	Water Amendment Act, 1986
111	National Parks Second Amendment Act, 1986
112	Borders of Particular States Extension Amendment Act, 1986

== 1987 ==
Act no.	Short title
1	Unauthorized Expenditure Act (House of Assembly), 1987
2	Housing Act (House of Representatives), 1987
3	Development Act (House of Representatives), 1987
4	Housing Development Act (House of Delegates), 1987
5	Part Appropriation Act, 1987
6	Financial Institutions Amendment Act, 1987
7	Transport Services Part Appropriation Act, 1987
8	Advanced Technical Education Amendment Act (House of Delegates), 1987
9	Rural Areas Act (House of Representatives), 1987
10	Part Appropriation Act (House of Assembly), 1987
11	Part Appropriation Act (House of Representatives), 1987
12	Part Appropriation Act (House of Delegates), 1987
13	Additional Appropriation Act (House of Delegates), 1987
14	Additional Appropriation Act, 1987
15	Post Office Part Appropriation Act, 1987
16	Judges' Remuneration Amendment Act, 1987
17	Admission of Advocates Amendment Act, 1987
18	State Tender Board Amendment Act, 1987
19	Additional Appropriation Act (House of Representatives), 1987
20	Constitution Amendment Act, 1987
21	Parliamentary and Provincial Medical Aid Scheme Amendment Act, 1987
22	Additional Appropriation Act (House of Assembly), 1987
23	Currency and Exchanges Amendment Act, 1987
24	Mediation in Certain Divorce Matters Act, 1987
25	Magistrates' Courts Amendment Act, 1987
26	Criminal Procedure Amendment Act, 1987
27	Insolvency Amendment Act, 1987
28	Post Office Appropriation Act, 1987
29	Sorghum Beer Amendment Act, 1987
30	Transport Services Appropriation Act, 1987
31	Sales Tax Amendment Act, 1987
32	Constitutional Laws Amendment Act, 1987
33	Abolition of the Fisheries Development Corporation of South Africa, Limited, Act, 1987
34	Universities (Education and Training) Amendment Act, 1987
35	Workmen's Compensation Amendment Act, 1987
36	Unemployment Insurance Amendment Act, 1987
37	Cape Town Foreshore Amendment Act, 1987
38	Mines and Works Amendment Act, 1987
39	Appropriation Act (House of Representatives), 1987
40	Eskom Act, 1987
41	Electricity Act, 1987
42	Energy Act, 1987
43	Nuclear Energy Amendment Act, 1987
44	Rand Afrikaans University (Private) Amendment Act, 1987 (House of Assembly)
45	Defence Amendment Act, 1987
46	Extradition Amendment Act, 1987
47	State Land Disposal Amendment Act, 1987
48	Town and Regional Planners Amendment Act, 1987
49	Appropriation Act (House of Assembly), 1987
50	Liquor Amendment Act, 1987
51	Agricultural Credit Amendment Act (House of Assembly), 1987
52	Forest Amendment Act, 1987
53	Credit Agreements Amendment Act, 1987
54	Merchandise Marks Amendment Act, 1987
55	Mental Health Amendment Act, 1987
56	Nursing Amendment Act, 1987
57	Agricultural Produce Agency Sales Amendment Act, 1987
58	Transport Advisory Council Act, 1987
59	Tweefontein Timber Company Limited Amendment Act, 1987
60	National Parks Amendment Act, 1987
61	Environment Conservation Amendment Act, 1987
62	Usury Amendment Act, 1987
63	Prevention and Combating of Pollution of the Sea by Oil Amendment Act, 1987
64	International Convention Relating to Intervention on the High Seas in Cases of Oil Pollution Casualties Act, 1987 (before 1997); Marine Pollution (Intervention) Act, 1987 (after 1997)
65	Architects' Amendment Act, 1987
66	Professional Land Surveyors' and Technical Surveyors' Amendment Act, 1987
67	Valuers' Amendment Act, 1987
68	Water Amendment Act, 1987
69	Sugar Amendment Act, 1987
70	Coal Amendment Act, 1987
71	Gold Mines Assistance Act Repeal Act, 1987
72	Temporary Removal of Restrictions on Economic Activities Amendment Act, 1987
73	Natural Scientists' Amendment Act, 1987
74	Land Titles Adjustment Amendment Act, 1987
75	Deeds Registries Amendment Act, 1987
76	Quantity Surveyors' Amendment Act, 1987
77	Appropriation Act (House of Delegates), 1987
78	Commission for Fresh Produce Markets Amendment Act, 1987
79	Marketing Amendment Act, 1987
80	Co-operatives Amendment Act, 1987
81	Intestate Succession Act, 1987
82	Children's Status Act, 1987
83	Appropriation Act, 1987
84	Customs and Excise Amendment Act, 1987
85	Income Tax Act, 1987
86	Taxation Laws Amendment Act, 1987
87	Protection of Businesses Amendment Act, 1987
88	Pension Laws Amendment Act, 1987
89	Pensions (Supplementary) Act, 1987
90	Forest Second Amendment Act, 1987
91	South African Transport Services Amendment Act, 1987
92	Security Officers Act, 1987
93	Finance Act, 1987
94	Local Councils Act (House of Assembly), 1987
95	Education Laws (Education and Training) Amendment Act, 1987
96	Maintenance and Promotion of Competition Amendment Act, 1987
97	Housing Amendment Act, 1987
98	Judges' Remuneration Second Amendment Act, 1987
99	Fire Brigade Services Act, 1987
100	Supreme Court Amendment Act, 1987
101	Land Affairs Act, 1987
102	Unemployment Insurance Second Amendment Act, 1987
103	Law of Evidence and the Criminal Procedure Act Amendment Act, 1987
104	Community Welfare Act (House of Representatives), 1987
105	Pension Benefits for Councillors of Local Authorities Act, 1987
106	Remuneration of Town Clerks Amendment Act, 1987

== 1988 ==
Act no.	Short title
1	Criminal Law Amendment Act, 1988
2	Immorality Amendment Act, 1988
3	Marriage and Matrimonial Property Law Amendment Act, 1988
4	Part Appropriation Act, 1988
5	Foreign States Immunities Amendment Act, 1988
6	Part Appropriation Act (House of Representatives), 1988
7	Part Appropriation Act (House of Delegates), 1988
8	Police Amendment Act, 1988
9	Public Accountants' and Auditors' Amendment Act, 1988
10	Part Appropriation Act (House of Assembly), 1988
11	South African Transport Services Amendment Act, 1988
12	Sea Fishery Act, 1988
13	Copyright Amendment Act, 1988
14	Forest Amendment Act, 1988
15	Additional Appropriation Act, 1988
16	Additional Appropriation Act (House of Representatives), 1988
17	Additional Appropriation Act (House of Delegates), 1988
18	Additional Appropriation Act (House of Assembly), 1988
19	State Land Disposal Amendment Act, 1988
20	Town and Regional Planners Amendment Act, 1988
21	Municipal Accountants' Act, 1988
22	Unauthorized Expenditure Act (House of Representatives), 1988
23	Transport Services Appropriation Act, 1988
24	Mineral Technology Amendment Act, 1988
25	National Supplies Procurement Amendment Act, 1988
26	Share Block Control Amendment Act, 1988
27	Export Credit and Foreign Investments Re-insurance Amendment Act, 1988
28	Diamonds Amendment Act, 1988
29	Unemployment Insurance Amendment Act, 1988
30	Boxing and Wrestling Control Amendment Act, 1988
31	Education Laws (Education and Training) Amendment Act, 1988
32	Enforcement of Foreign Civil Judgments Act, 1988
33	Technikons (National Education) Amendment Act (House of Assembly), 1988
34	Post Office Appropriation Act, 1988
35	Church Square, Pretoria, Development Amendment Act (House of Assembly), 1988
36	Wine and Spirit Amendment Act, 1988
37	Water Amendment Act, 1988
38	Co-operatives Amendment Act, 1988
39	Gambling Amendment Act, 1988
40	Rand Water Board Statutes (Private) Act Amendment Act, 1988
41	South African Transport Services Conditions of Service Act, 1988
42	Black Communities Development Amendment Act, 1988
43	Constitutional Laws Amendment Act, 1988
44	Friendly Societies Amendment Act, 1988
45	Law of Evidence Amendment Act, 1988
46	Scientific Research Council Act, 1988
47	Abolition of Development Bodies Amendment Act, 1988
48	Currency and Exchanges Amendment Act, 1988
49	Regional Services Councils Amendment Act, 1988
50	Constitution Amendment Act, 1988
51	Financial Institutions Amendment Act, 1988
52	Mental Health Amendment Act, 1988
53	Development Aid Laws Amendment Act, 1988
54	Excision of Released Areas Act, 1988
55	Central Energy Fund Amendment Act, 1988
56	Nuclear Energy Amendment Act, 1988
57	Trust Property Control Act, 1988
58	Appropriation Act (House of Representatives), 1988
59	Borders of Particular States Extension Amendment Act, 1988
60	Arms and Ammunition Amendment Act, 1988
61	Appropriation Act (House of Delegates), 1988
62	Appropriation Act (House of Assembly), 1988
63	Companies Amendment Act, 1988
64	Close Corporations Amendment Act, 1988
65	Housing Development Schemes for Retired Persons Act, 1988
66	Tertiary Education Act, 1988
67	Temporary Removal of Restrictions on Economic Activities Amendment Act, 1988
68	Commission for Administration Amendment Act, 1988
69	Customs and Excise Amendment Act, 1988
70	Education Affairs Act (House of Assembly), 1988
71	Harmful Business Practices Act, 1988 (before 1999); Consumer Affairs (Unfair Business Practices) Act, 1988 (after 1999)
72	Registration of Services-type Uniforms Act, 1988
73	Mining Rights Amendment Act, 1988
74	South African Roads Board Act, 1988
75	Profession of Town Clerks Act, 1988
76	Patents Amendment Act, 1988
77	Mineral Laws Supplementary Act Amendment Act, 1988
78	University of Pretoria (Private) Amendment Act, 1988 (House of Assembly)
79	Appropriation Act, 1988
80	Transport Deregulation Act, 1988
81	Conversion of Certain Rights to Leasehold Act, 1988 (before 1993); Conversion of Certain Rights into Leasehold or Ownership Act, 1988 (after 1993)
82	Promotion of Local Government Affairs Amendment Act, 1988
83	Labour Relations Amendment Act, 1988
84	Local Government Training Amendment Act, 1988
85	National States Constitution Amendment Act, 1988
86	Promotion of Constitutional Development Act, 1988
87	Taxation Laws Amendment Act, 1988
88	Finance Act, 1988
89	Pension Laws Amendment Act, 1988
90	Income Tax Act, 1988
91	Cape of Good Hope Savings Bank Society Amendment Act, 1988
92	Accountants' and Auditors' and Financial Institutions Amendment Act, 1988
93	Land Bank Amendment Act, 1988
94	Prior Votes for Election of Members of Local Government Bodies Act, 1988
95	Black Local Authorities Amendment Act, 1988
96	South African Reserve Bank, Banking Institutions, Mutual Building Societies and Building Societies Amendment Act, 1988
97	Constitutional Laws Second Amendment Act, 1988
98	University of Port Elizabeth (Private) Amendment Act, 1988 (House of Assembly)
99	Income Tax Amendment Act, 1988
100	Usury Amendment Act, 1988
101	Constitution Third Amendment Act, 1988
102	Free Settlement Areas Act, 1988
103	Local Government Affairs in Free Settlement Areas Act, 1988
104	Prevention of Illegal Squatting Amendment Act, 1988

== 1989 ==
Act no.	Short title
1	Part Appropriation Act, 1989
2	Additional Post Office Appropriation Act, 1989
3	Merchant Shipping Amendment Act, 1989
4	Transport Services Additional Appropriation Act, 1989
5	Additional Appropriation Act, 1989
6	Reciprocal Enforcement of Maintenance Orders (Countries in Africa) Act, 1989
7	Divorce Amendment Act, 1989
8	Criminal Procedure Amendment Act, 1989
9	Legal Succession to the South African Transport Services Act, 1989
10	Part Appropriation Act (House of Assembly), 1989
11	Part Appropriation Act (House of Representatives), 1989
12	Part Appropriation Act (House of Delegates), 1989
13	Banking Institutions, Mutual Building Societies and Building Societies Amendment Act, 1989
14	Transfer of the South African Railways Police Force to the South African Police Amendment Act, 1989
15	Additional Appropriation Act (House of Representatives), 1989
16	Additional Appropriation Act (House of Delegates), 1989
17	Additional Appropriation Act (House of Assembly), 1989
18	Agricultural Pests Amendment Act, 1989
19	Veterinary and Para-Veterinary Professions Amendment Act, 1989
20	Housing Development Schemes for Retired Persons Amendment Act, 1989
21	Inventions Development Amendment Act, 1989
22	Diamonds Amendment Act, 1989
23	Rent Control Amendment Act, 1989
24	Deeds Registries Amendment Act, 1989
25	Forest Amendment Act, 1989
26	Disclosure of Foreign Funding Act, 1989
27	Liquor Act, 1989
28	Transport Services Appropriation Act, 1989
29	Road Traffic Act, 1989
30	Mineral Technology Act, 1989
31	Development Trust and Land Amendment Act, 1989
32	Pensions (Supplementary) Act, 1989
33	Rand Afrikaans University (Private) Amendment Act, 1989 (House of Assembly)
34	University of the Orange Free State (Private) Amendment Act, 1989 (House of Assembly)
35	Education and Training Amendment Act, 1989
36	Police Amendment Act, 1989
37	Social Aid Act (House of Assembly), 1989
38	Post Office Appropriation Act, 1989
39	Criminal Law and the Criminal Procedure Act Amendment Act, 1989
40	Machinery and Occupational Safety Amendment Act, 1989
41	Groot Constantia State Estate Control Amendment Act (House of Assembly), 1989
42	Incorporation of Certain Land in the Republic of South Africa Act, 1989
43	Development and Housing Amendment Act (House of Assembly), 1989
44	Technical Colleges Amendment Act (House of Assembly), 1989
45	Finance Amendment Act, 1989
46	Alexander Bay Development Corporation Act, 1989
47	Legal Aid Amendment Act, 1989
48	Social Work Amendment Act, 1989
49	South African Reserve Bank Amendment Act, 1989
50	Herbert Ainsworth Settlers Trust Amendment Act, 1989
51	Human Tissue Amendment Act, 1989
52	Auditor-General Act, 1989
53	Financial Institutions Amendment Act, 1989
54	Financial Institutions Second Amendment Act, 1989
55	Financial Markets Control Act, 1989
56	Reinsurance of Material Damage and Losses Act, 1989 (before 1990); Reinsurance of Damage and Losses Act, 1989 (after 1990)
57	Conversion of Iscor, Limited, Act, 1989
58	Electricity Amendment Act, 1989
59	South African Tourism Board Amendment Act, 1989
60	Liquor Products Act, 1989
61	Copyright Amendment Act, 1989
62	National Building Regulations and Building Standards Amendment Act, 1989
63	Small Claims Courts Amendment Act, 1989
64	Universities Amendment Act (House of Assembly), 1989
65	Cultural Affairs Act (House of Assembly), 1989
66	Cultural Institutions Act (House of Assembly), 1989
67	Appropriation Act, 1989
68	Customs and Excise Amendment Act, 1989
69	Taxation Laws Amendment Act, 1989
70	Income Tax Act, 1989
71	Constitution Fourth Amendment Act, 1989
72	Energy Amendment Act, 1989
73	Environment Conservation Act, 1989
74	Diplomatic Immunities and Privileges Act, 1989
75	Police Second Amendment Act, 1989
76	Police Third Amendment Act, 1989
77	Judicial Matters Amendment Act, 1989
78	Companies Amendment Act, 1989
79	Pension Laws Amendment Act, 1989
80	Finance Act, 1989
81	Appropriation Act (House of Assembly), 1989
82	Appropriation Act (House of Representatives), 1989
83	Appropriation Act (House of Delegates), 1989
84	Local Government Affairs Council Act (House of Assembly), 1989
85	Unauthorized Expenditure Act (House of Representatives), 1989
86	Pensions Second (Supplementary) Act, 1989
87	Attorneys Amendment Act, 1989
88	Judges' Remuneration and Conditions of Employment Act, 1989
89	Insolvency Amendment Act, 1989
90	South African Reserve Bank Act, 1989
91	Usury Amendment Act, 1989
92	Elections and Identification Amendment Act, 1989
93	Multilateral Motor Vehicle Accidents Fund Act, 1989
94	Housing Amendment Act (House of Representatives), 1989
95	Development Amendment Act (House of Representatives), 1989
