= Statute of Anne =

Act of the Parliament of Great Britain regarding copyright

- Act of Parliament
- Parliament of Great Britain
- Long title: An Act for the Encouragement of Learning, by Vesting the Copies of Printed Books in the Authors or Purchasers of such Copies, during the Times therein mentioned.
- Citation: 8 Ann. c. 21 (Note: This is the citation in The Statutes of the Realm (published 1810–25), based on the original Parliament Rolls.); 8 Ann. c. 19 (Note: This is the citation in The Statutes at Large, based on the copies of acts enrolled in Chancery.)
- Introduced by: Edward Wortley (Commons)
- Territorial extent: England and Wales; Scotland; Ireland

Dates
- Royal assent: 5 April 1710
- Commencement: 10 April 1710 (Note: Section 1.)
- Repealed: 1 July 1842
Other legislation
Amended by	Engraving Copyright Act 1734; Copyright Act 1775; Copyright Act 1814; Customs Law Repeal Act 1825
Repealed by	Copyright Act 1842
Relates to	Licensing of the Press Act 1662

Status: Repealed

Text of statute as originally enacted

The Statute of Anne (8 Ann. c. 21), also known as the Copyright Act 1709 or the Copyright Act 1710, was an act of the Parliament of Great Britain passed in 1710, which was the first statute to provide for copyright regulated by the government and courts, rather than by private parties.

Prior to the statute's enactment in 1710, copying restrictions were authorised by the Licensing of the Press Act 1662 (14 Cha. 2. c. 33). These restrictions were enforced by the Stationers' Company, a guild of printers given the exclusive power to print—and the responsibility to censor—literary works. The censorship administered under the 1662 act led to public protest; as the act had to be renewed at two-year intervals, authors and others sought to prevent its reauthorisation. Following the expiry of the 1662 act in 1694, Parliament refused to renew the act, ending the Stationers' monopoly and press restrictions.

Over the next 10 years the Stationers repeatedly advocated bills to re-authorise the old licensing system, but Parliament declined to enact them. Faced with this failure, the Stationers decided to emphasise the benefits of licensing to authors rather than publishers, and the Stationers succeeded in getting Parliament to consider a new bill. On 12 December 1709, the Stationers submitted yet another petition asking for legislation on the issue, and the House of Commons gave three MPs – Spencer Compton, Craven Peyton and Edward Wortley – permission to form a drafting committee. On 11 January 1710, Wortley introduced this bill, titling it A Bill for the Encouragement of Learning and for Securing the Property of Copies of Books to the rightful Owners thereof. This bill, which after substantial amendments was granted royal assent on 5 April 1710, became known as the Statute of Anne owing to its passage during the reign of Queen Anne. The new law prescribed a copyright term of 14 years, with a provision for renewal for a similar term, during which only the author and the printers to whom they chose to license their works could publish the author's creations. Following this, the work's copyright would expire, with the material falling into the public domain. Despite a period of instability known as the Battle of the Booksellers when the initial copyright terms under the statute began to expire, the statute remained in force until the Copyright Act 1842 (5 & 6 Vict. c. 45) replaced it.

The statute is considered a "watershed event in Anglo-American copyright history ... transforming what had been the publishers' private law copyright into a public law grant". Under the statute, copyright was for the first time vested in authors rather than publishers; it also included provisions for the public interest, such as a legal deposit scheme. The statute was an influence on copyright law in several other nations, including the United States, and even in the 21st century is "frequently invoked by modern judges and academics as embodying the utilitarian underpinnings of copyright law".

== Background ==
With the introduction of the printing press to England by William Caxton in 1476, printed works became both more common and more economically important. As early as 1483, Richard III recognised the value of literary works by specifically exempting them from the government's protectionist legislation. Over the next fifty years, the government moved further towards economic regulation, abolishing the provision with the Printers and Binders Act 1533 (25 Hen. 8. c. 15), which also banned the import of foreign works and empowered the Lord Chancellor to set maximum pricing for English books. This was followed by increasing degrees of censorship. A further proclamation of 1538, aiming to stop the spread of Lutheran doctrine, saw Henry VIII note that "sondry contentious and sinyster opiniones, have by wrong teachynge and naughtye bokes increaced and growen within this his realme of England", and declare that all authors and printers must allow the Privy Council or their agents to read and censor books before publication.

=== Stationers' Company ===
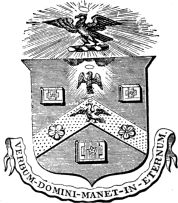
The Mark of the Stationers' Company, who held a monopoly on the right to copy from 1556 until 1695

This censorship peaked on 4 May 1557, when Mary I issued a royal warrant formally incorporating the Stationers' Company. The old method of censorship had been limited by the Second Statute of Repeal, and with Mary's increasing unpopularity the existing system was unable to cope with the number of critical works being printed. Instead, the royal warrant devolved this power to the company. This was done by decreeing that only the company's publishers could print and distribute books. Their Wardens were given the power to enter any printing premises, destroy illegal works and imprison anyone found manufacturing them. In this way the government "harnessed the self interest of the publishers to the yoke of royal incentive", guaranteeing that the company would follow the rules due to the economic monopoly it gave their members. With the abolition of the Star Chamber and Court of High Commission by the Long Parliament, the legal basis for this warrant was removed, but the Long Parliament chose to replace it with the Licensing Act 1662 (14 Cha. 2. c. 33). This provided that the company would retain their original powers, and imposed additional restrictions on printing; King's Messengers were permitted to enter any home or business in search of illegal presses. The legislation required renewal every two years, and was regularly reapproved.

This was not "copyright" as is normally understood; although there was a monopoly on the right to copy, this was available to publishers, not authors, and did not exist by default; it only applied to books which had been accepted and published by the company. A member of the company would register the book, and would then have a perpetual copyright over its printing, copying and publication, which could be leased, transferred to others or given to heirs upon the member's death. The only exception to this was that, if a person tried to make a copy of a copyrighted material and warned the owner of the copyright (i.e. the printer), and the owner did not reprint it within six months, then this person could continue with the printing (provided that the author of the material did not object), giving a "ratable" part of the profits to the owner of the copyright. This did not mean, though, a loss of copyright ownership, but a provision to allow other presses the right to reprint books that were unavailable. Authors themselves were not particularly respected until the 18th century, and were not permitted to be members of the company, playing no role in the development or use of its licences despite the company's sovereign authority to decide what was published. There is evidence that some authors were recognised by the Company itself to have the right to copy and the right to alter their works; these authors were uniformly the writers of uneconomical books who were underwriting their publication.

The company's monopoly, censorship and failure to protect authors made the system highly unpopular; John Milton wrote Areopagitica as a result of his experiences with the company, accusing Parliament of being deceived by "the fraud of some old patentees and monopolisers in the trade of bookselling". He was not the first writer to criticise the system, with John Locke writing a formal memorandum to the MP Edward Clarke in 1693 while the Licensing Act was being renewed, complaining that the existing system restricted the free exchange of ideas and education while providing an unfair monopoly for Company members. Academic Mark Rose attributes the efforts of Milton to promote the "bourgeois public sphere", along with the Glorious Revolution's alterations to the political system and the rise of public coffee houses, as the source of growing public unhappiness with the system. At the same time, this was a period in which clearly defined political parties were taking shape, and with the promise of regular elections, an environment where the public were of increasing importance to the political process. The result was a "developing public sphere [which] provided the context that enabled the collapse of traditional press controls".

=== Lapse of the Licensing of the Press Act 1662 ===
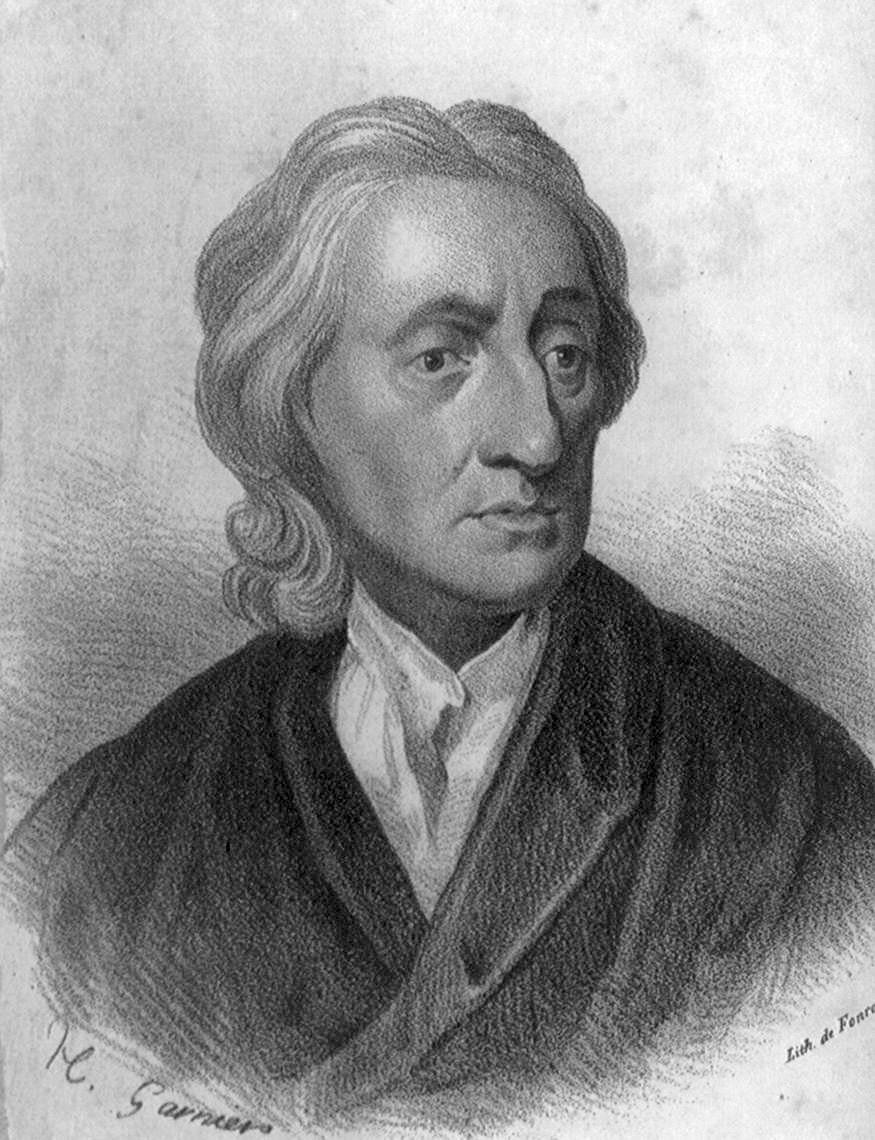
John Locke, whose close relationship with Edward Clarke led to the repeal of the Licensing Act

The Licensing of the Press Act 1662 (14 Cha. 2. c. 33), which was continued by the Licensing of the Press Act 1664 (16 Cha. 2. c. 8), the Licensing of the Press (No. 2) Act 1664 (16 & 17 Cha. 2. c. 7), the Licensing of the Press Act 1665 (17 Cha. 2. c. 4), the Administration of Intestates' Estate Act 1685 (1 Ja. 2. c. 17) and the Estreats (Personal Representatives) Act 1692 (4 Will. & Mar. c. 24), lapsed on 25 April 1694.

In November 1694, a committee was appointed by the Commons to see what laws were "lately expired and expiring [and] fit to be revived and continued". The Committee reported in January 1695, and suggested the renewal of the 1662 act; this was included in the "Continuation Bill", but rejected by the House of Commons on 11 February. When it reached the House of Lords, the Lords re-included the 1662 act, and returned the bill to the Commons. In response, a second committee was appointed – this one to produce a report indicating why the Commons disagreed with the inclusion of the Licensing Act, and chaired by Edward Clarke. This committee soon reported to the Commons, and Clarke was ordered to carry a message to the Lords requesting a conference over the 1662 act. On 18 April 1695, Clarke met with representatives of the Lords, and they agreed to allow the Continuation Bill to pass without the renewal of the act. With this, "the Lords' decision heralded an end to a relationship that had developed throughout the sixteenth and seventeenth centuries between the State and the Company of Stationers", ending both nascent publishers' copyright and the existing system of censorship.

John Locke's close relationship with Clarke, along with the respect he commanded, is seen by academics as what led to this decision. Locke had spent the early 1690s campaigning against the statute, considering it "ridiculous" that the works of dead authors were held perpetually in copyright. In letters to Clarke he wrote of the absurdity of the existing system, complaining primarily about the unfairness of it to authors, and "[t]he parallels between Locke's commentary and those reasons presented by the Commons to the Lords for refusing to renew the 1662 act are striking". He was assisted by a number of independent printers and booksellers, who opposed the monopolistic aspects of the act, and introduced a petition in February 1693 that the act prevented them from conducting their business. The "developing public sphere", along with the harm the existing system had caused to both major political parties, is also seen as a factor.

The failure to renew the Licensing Act led to confusion and both positive and negative outcomes; while the government no longer played a part in censoring publications, and the monopoly of the Company over printing was broken, there was uncertainty as to whether or not copyright was a binding legal concept without the legislation. Economic chaos also resulted; with the company now unable to enforce any monopoly, provincial towns began establishing printing presses, producing cheaper books than the London booksellers. The absence of the censorship provisions also opened Britain up as a market for internationally printed books, which were similarly cheaper than those British printers could produce.

=== Attempts at replacement ===
The rejection of the existing system was not done with universal approval, and there were ultimately twelve unsuccessful attempts to replace it. The first was introduced to the House of Commons on 11 February 1695. A committee, again led by Clarke, was to write a "Bill for the Better Regulating of Printing and the Printing Presses". This bill was essentially a copy of the Licensing Act, but with a narrower jurisdiction; only books covering religion, history, the affairs of the state or the law would require official authorisation. Four days after its introduction, the Stationers' held an emergency meeting to agree to petition the Commons – this was because the bill did not contain any reference to books as property, eliminating their monopoly on copying. Clarke also had issues with the provisions, and the debate went on until the end of the Parliamentary session, with the bill failing to pass.

With the end of the Parliamentary session came the first general election under the Triennial Act 1694 (6 & 7 Will. & Mar. c. 2), which required the Monarch to dissolve Parliament every 3 years, causing a general election. This led to the "golden age" of the English electorate, and allowed for the forming of two major political parties – the Whigs and Tories. At the same time, with the failure to renew the 1662 act, a political press developed. While the act had been in force only one official newspaper existed; the London Gazette, published by the government. After its demise, a string of newspapers sprang into being, including the Flying Post, the Evening Post and the Daily Courant. Newspapers had a strong bias towards particular parties, with the Courant and the Flying Post supporting the Whigs and the Evening Post in favour of the Tories, leading to politicians from both parties realising the importance of an efficient propaganda machine in influencing the electorate. This added a new dimension to the Commons' decision to reject two new renewals of the Licensing Act in the new Parliamentary session.

Authors, as well as Stationers, then joined the demand for a new system of licensing. Jonathan Swift was a strong advocate for licensing, and Daniel Defoe wrote on 8 November 1705 that with the absence of licensing, "One Man Studies Seven Year, to bring a finish'd Peice into the World, and a Pyrate Printer, Reprints his Copy immediately, and Sells it for a quarter of the Price ... these things call for an Act of Parliament". Seeing this, the Company took the opportunity to experiment with a change to their approach and argument. Instead of lobbying because of the effect the absence of legislation was having on their trade, they lobbied on behalf of the authors, but seeking the same things. The first indication of this change in approach comes from the 1706 pamphlet by John How, a stationer, titled Reasons humbly Offer'd for a Bill for the Encouragement of Learning and the Improvement of Printing. This argued for a return to licensing, not with reference to the printers, but because without something to protect authors and guarantee them an income, "Learned men will be wholly discouraged from Propagating the most useful Parts of Knowledge and Literature". Using these new tactics and the support of authors, the Company petitioned Parliament again in both 1707 and 1709 to introduce a bill providing for copyright.

== Act ==
=== Passage ===
Although both bills failed, they led to media pressure that was exacerbated by both Defoe and How. Defoe's A Review, published on 3 December 1709 and demanding "a Law in the present Parliament ... for the Encouragement of Learning, Arts, and Industry, by securing the Property of Books to the Authors or Editors of them", was followed by How's Some Thoughts on the Present State of Printing and Bookselling, which hoped that Parliament "might think fit to secure Property in Books by a Law". This was followed by another review by Defoe on 6 December, in which he even went so far as to provide a draft text for the bill. On 12 December, the Stationers submitted yet another petition asking for legislation on the issue, and the House of Commons gave three MPs – Spencer Compton, Craven Peyton and Edward Wortley – permission to form a drafting committee. On 11 January 1710, Wortley introduced this bill, titling it A Bill for the Encouragement of Learning and for Securing the Property of Copies of Books to the rightful Owners thereof.

The bill imposed fines on anyone who imported or traded in unlicensed or foreign books, required every book for which copyright protection was sought to be entered into the Stationers' Register, provided a legal deposit system centred around the King's Library, the University of Oxford and the University of Cambridge, but said nothing about limiting the term of copyright. It also specified that books were property; an emphasis on the idea that authors deserved copyright simply due to their efforts. The Stationers were enthusiastic, urging Parliament to pass the bill, and it received its second reading on 9 February. A Committee of the Whole met to amend it on 21 February, with further alterations made when it was passed back to the House of Commons on 25 February. Alterations during this period included minor changes, such as extending the legal deposit system to cover Sion College and the Faculty of Advocates, but also major ones, including the introduction of a limit on the length of time for which copyright would be granted.

Linguistic amendments were also included; the line in the preamble emphasising that authors possessed books as they would any other piece of property was dropped, and the bill moved from something designed "for Securing the Property of Copies of Books to the rightful Owners thereof" to a bill "for the Encouragement of Learning, by Vesting the Copies of Printed Books in the Authors or Purchasers of such Copies". Another amendment allowed anyone to own and trade in copies of books, undermining the Stationers. Other changes were made when the bill went to the House of Lords, and it was finally returned to the Commons on 5 April. The aims of the resulting statute are debated; Ronan Deazley suggests that the intent was to balance the rights of the author, publisher and public in such a way as to ensure the maximum dissemination of works, while other academics argue that the bill was intended to protect the company's monopoly or, conversely, to weaken it. Oren Bracha, writing in the Berkeley Technology Law Journal, says that when considering which of these options are correct, "the most probable answer [is] all of them". Whatever the motivations, the bill was passed on 5 April 1710, and is commonly known simply as the Statute of Anne due its passage during the reign of Queen Anne.

=== Text ===
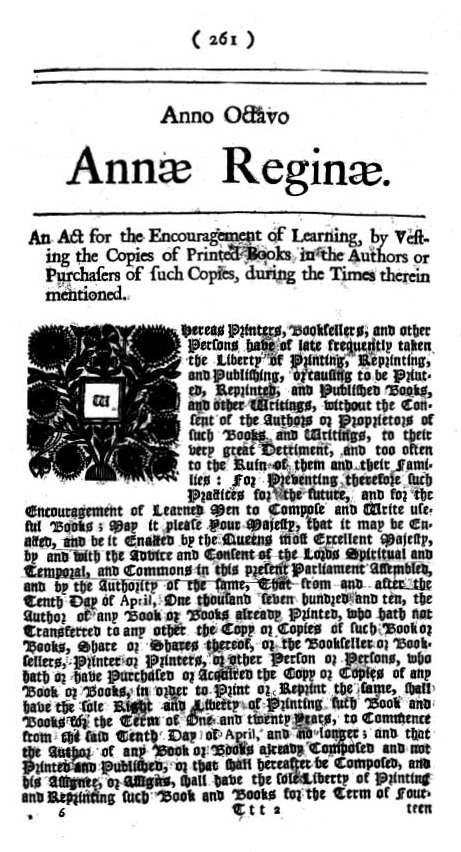
The Statute of Anne

Consisting of 11 sections, the Statute of Anne is formally titled "An Act for the Encouragement of Learning, by Vesting the Copies of Printed Books in the Authors or Purchasers of Copies, during the Times therein mentioned". The preamble for the statute indicates the purpose of the legislation – to bring order to the book trade – saying:

Whereas Printers, Booksellers, and other Persons, have of late frequently taken the Liberty of Printing, Reprinting, and Publishing, or causing to be Printed, Reprinted, and Published Books, and other Writings, without the Consent of the Authors or Proprietors of such Books and Writings, to their very great Detriment, and too often to the Ruin of them and their Families: For Preventing therefore such Practices for the future, and for the Encouragement of Learned Men to Compose and Write useful Books; May it please Your Majesty, that it may be Enacted ...

The statute then continued by stating the nature of copyright. The right granted was the right to copy; to have sole control over the printing and reprinting of books, with no provision to benefit the owner of this right after the sale. This right, previously held by the Stationers' Company's members, would automatically be given to the author as soon as it was published, although they had the ability to license these rights to another person. The copyright could be gained through two stages; first, the registration of the book's publication with the company, to prevent unintentional infringement, and second, the deposit of copies of the book at the Stationers' Company, the royal library and various universities. One restriction on copyright was a "cumbersome system" designed to prohibit unreasonably high prices for books, which limited how much authors could charge for copies. There was also a prohibition on importing foreign works, with exceptions made for Latin and Greek classics.

Once registration had been completed and the deposits were made, the author was granted an exclusive right to control the copying of the book. Penalties for infringing this right were severe, with all infringing copies to be destroyed and large fines to be paid to both the copyright holder and the government; there was only a three-month statute of limitations on bringing a case, however. This exclusive right's length was dependent on when the book had been published. If it was published after 10 April 1710, the length of copyright was 14 years; if published before that date, 21 years. An author who survived until the copyright expired would be granted an additional 14-year term, and when that ran out, the works would enter the public domain. Copyright under the statute applied to Scotland and England, as well as Ireland when that country joined the union in 1800.

== Aftermath ==
=== Impact ===
The statute was initially welcomed, ushering in "stability to an insecure book trade" while providing for a "pragmatic bargain" between the rights of the author, publisher and public intended to boost public learning and the availability of knowledge. The clause requiring book deposits, however, was not seen as a success. If the books were not deposited, the penalties would be severe, with a fine of £5. The number of deposits required, however, meant that it was a substantial burden; a print run might only be of 250 copies, and if they were particularly expensive to print, it could be cheaper to ignore the law. Some booksellers argued that the deposit provision only applied to registered books, and so deliberately avoided registration just to be able to minimise their liability. This was further undermined by the ruling in Beckford v Hood, where the Court of King's Bench confirmed that, even without registration, copyright could be enforced against infringers.

Another failure, identified by Bracha, is not found in what the statute covered, but in what it did not. The statute did not provide any means for identifying authors, did not identify what constituted authored works, and covered only "books", even while discussing "property" as a whole. Moreover, the right provided was merely that of "making and selling ... exact reprints. To a large extent, the new regime was the old stationer's privilege, except it was universalised, capped in time, and formally conferred upon authors rather than publishers". The effect of the statute on authors was also minimal. Previously, publishers would have bought the original manuscript from writers for a lump sum; with the passage of the statute, they simply did the same thing, but with the manuscript's copyright as well. The remaining economic power of the company also allowed them to pressure booksellers and distributors into continuing their past arrangements, meaning that even theoretically "public domain" works were, in practise, still treated as copyrighted.

=== Battle of the Booksellers ===
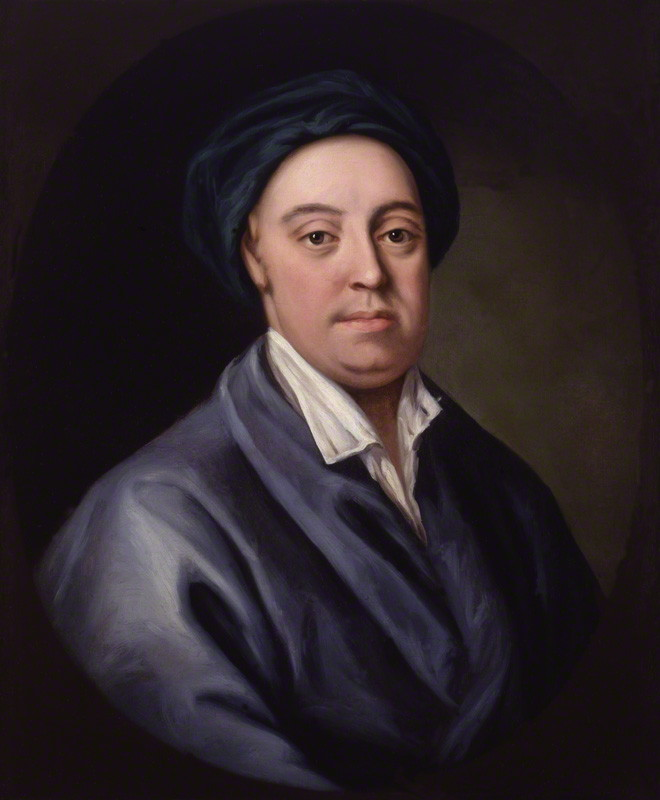
James Thomson, whose work The Seasons was the subject of Millar v Taylor

When the copyrights granted to works published before the statute began to expire in 1731, the Stationers' Company and their publishers again began to fight to preserve the status quo. Their first port of call was Parliament, where they lobbied for new legislation to extend the length of copyright, and when this failed, they turned to the courts. Their principal argument was that copyright had not been created by the Statute of Anne; it existed beforehand, in the common law, and was perpetual. As such, even though the statute provided for a limited term, all works remained in copyright under the common law regardless of when statutory copyright expired. Starting in 1743, this began a thirty-year campaign known as the "Battle of the Booksellers". They first tried going to the Court of Chancery and applying for injunctions prohibiting other publishers from printing their works, and this was initially successful. A series of legal setbacks over the next few years, however, left the law ambiguous.

The first major action taken to clarify the situation was Millar v Taylor. Andrew Millar, a British publisher, purchased the rights to James Thomson's The Seasons in 1729, and when the copyright term expired, a competing publisher named Robert Taylor began issuing his own reprints of the work. Millar sued, and went to the Court of King's Bench to obtain an injunction and advocate perpetual copyright at common law. The jury found that the facts submitted by Millar were accurate, and asked the judges to clarify whether common law copyright existed. The first arguments were delivered on 30 June 1767, with John Dunning representing Millar and Edward Thurlow representing Taylor. A second set of arguments were submitted for Millar by William Blackstone on 7 June, and judgment was given on 20 April 1769. The final decision, written by Lord Mansfield and endorsed by Aston and Willes JJ, confirmed that there existed copyright at common law that turned "upon Principles before and independent" of the Statute of Anne, something justified because it was right "that an Author should reap the pecuniary Profits of his own Ingenuity and Labour". In other words, regardless of the statute, there existed a perpetual copyright under the common law. Yates J dissented, on the grounds that the focus on the author obscured the effect this decision would have on "the rest of mankind", which he felt would be to create a virtual monopoly, something that would harm the public and should certainly not be considered "an encouragement of the propagation of learning".

Although this decision was a boon to the Stationers, it was short-lived. Following Millar, the right to print The Seasons was sold to a coalition of publishers including Thomas Becket. Two Scottish printers, Alexander and John Donaldson, began publishing an unlicensed edition, and Becket successfully obtained an injunction to stop them. This decision was appealed in Donaldson v Beckett, and eventually went to the House of Lords. After consulting with the judges of the King's Bench, Common Pleas and Exchequer of Pleas, the Lords concluded that copyright was not perpetual, and that the term permitted by the Statute of Anne was the maximum length of legal protection for publishers and authors alike.

=== Expansion and repeal ===
Copyright Act 1814
- Act of Parliament
- Parliament of the United Kingdom
- Long title: An Act to amend the several Acts for the Encouragement of Learning, by securing the Copies and Copyright of Printed Books, to the Authors of such Books or their Assigns.
- Citation: 54 Geo. 3. c. 156
- Territorial extent: United Kingdom

Dates
- Royal assent: 29 July 1814
- Commencement: 29 July 1814 (Note: The Acts of Parliament (Commencement) Act 1793.)
- Repealed: 1 July 1842
Other legislation
Amends	Statute of Anne; Copyright Act 1801
Amended by	Copyright Act 1836
Repealed by	Copyright Act 1842

Status: Repealed

Text of statute as originally enacted

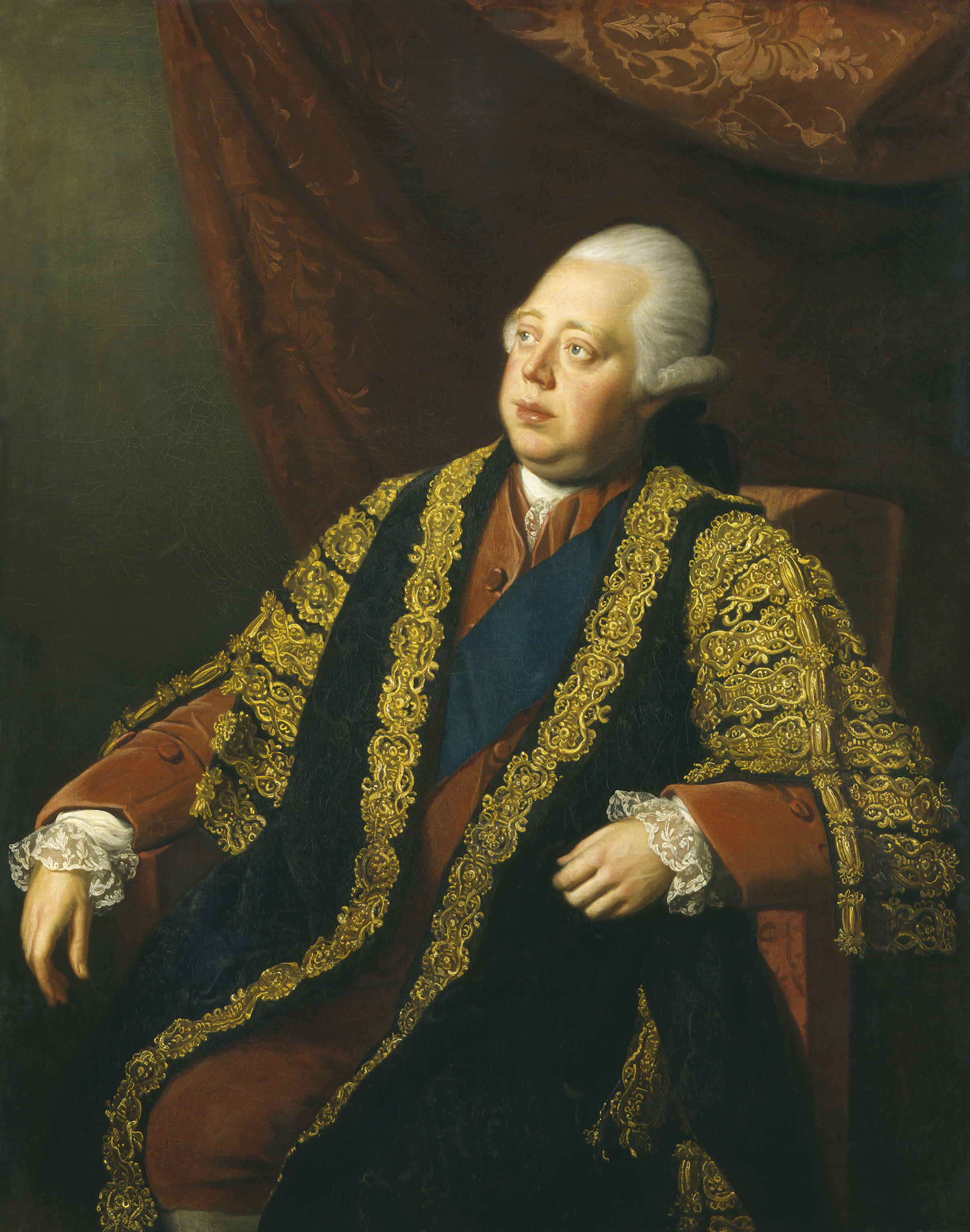
Lord North, who expanded the provisions of the Statute of Anne in 1775

Until its repeal, most extensions to copyright law were based around provisions found in the Statute of Anne. The one successful bill from the lobbying in the 1730s, which came into force on 29 September 1739, extended the provision prohibiting the import of foreign books to also prohibit the import of books that, while originally published in Britain, were being reprinted in foreign nations and then shipped to England and Wales. This was intended to stop the influx of cheap books from Ireland, and also repealed the price restrictions in the Statute of Anne. Another alteration was over the legal deposit provisions of the statute, which many booksellers found unfair. Despite an initial period of compliance, the principle of donating copies of books to certain libraries lapsed, partly due to the unwieldiness of the statute's provisions and partly because of a lack of cooperation by the publishers. In 1775 Lord North, who was Chancellor of the University of Oxford, succeeded in passing a bill that reiterated the legal deposit provisions and granted the universities perpetual copyright on their works.

Another range of extensions came in relation to what could be copyrighted. The statute only referred to books, and being an act of Parliament, it was necessary to pass further legislation to include various other types of intellectual property. The Engraving Copyright Act 1734 (8 Geo. 2. c. 13) extended copyright to cover engravings, statutes in 1789 and 1792 involved cloth, sculptures were copyrighted in 1814 and the performance of plays and music were covered by copyright in 1833 and 1842 respectively. The length of copyright was also altered; the Copyright Act 1814 (54 Geo. 3. c. 156) set a copyright term of either 28 years, or the natural life of the author if this was longer. Despite these expansions, some still felt copyright was not a strong enough regime. In 1837, Thomas Noon Talfourd introduced a bill into Parliament to expand the scope of copyright. A friend of many men of letters, Talfourd aimed to provide adequate rewards for authors and artists. He campaigned for copyright to exist for the life of the author, with an additional 60 years after that. He also proposed that existing statutes be codified under the bill, so that the case law that had arisen around the Statute of Anne was clarified.

Talfourd's proposals led to opposition, and he reintroduced modified versions of them year on year. Printers, publishers and booksellers were concerned about the cost implications for original works, and for reprinting works that had fallen out of copyright. Many within Parliament argued that the bill failed to take into account the public interest, including Lord Macaulay, who succeeded in defeating one of Talfourd's bills in 1841. The Copyright Act 1842 (5 & 6 Vict. c. 45) passed, but "fell far short of Talfourd's dream of a uniform, consistent, codified law of copyright". It extended copyright to life plus seven years, and, as part of the codification clauses, repealed the Statute of Anne.

=== Significance ===
The Statute of Anne is traditionally seen as "a historic moment in the development of copyright", and the first statute in the world to provide for copyright. Craig Joyce and Lyman Ray Patterson, writing in the Emory Law Journal, call this a "too simple understanding [that] ignores the statute's source", arguing that it is at best a derivative of the Licensing Act. Even considering this, however, the Statute of Anne was "the watershed event in Anglo-American copyright history ... transforming what had been the publishers' private law copyright into a public law grant". Patterson, writing separately, does note the differences between the Licensing Act and the Statute of Anne; the question of censorship was, by 1710, out of the question, and in that regard the statute is distinct, not providing for censorship.

It also marked the first time that copyright had been vested primarily in the author, rather than the publisher, and also the first time that the injurious treatment of authors by publishers was recognised; regardless of what authors signed away, the second 14-year term of copyright would automatically return to them. Even in the 21st century, the Statute of Anne is "frequently invoked by modern judges and academics as embodying the utilitarian underpinnings of copyright law". In IceTV Pty Ltd v Nine Network Australia Pty Ltd, for example, the High Court of Australia noted that the title of the statute "echoed explicitly the emphasis on the practical or utilitarian importance that certain seventeenth-century philosophers attached to knowledge and its encouragement in the scheme of human progress". Despite "widely recognised flaws", the act became a model copyright statute, both within the United Kingdom and internationally. Christophe Geiger notes that it is "a difficult, almost impossible task" to analyse the relationship between the Statute of Anne and early French copyright law, both because it is difficult to make a direct connection, and because the ongoing debate over both has led to radically different interpretations of each nation's law.

Similarly, Belgium took no direct influence from the statute or English copyright theory, but Joris Deene of the University of Ghent identifies an indirect influence "at two levels"; the criteria for what constitutes copyrightable material, which comes from the work of English theorists such as Locke and Edward Young, and the underlying justification of copyright law. In Belgium, this justification is both that copyright serves the public interest, and that copyright is a "private right" that serves the interests of individual authors. Both theories were taken into account in Donaldson v Beckett, as well as in the drafting of the Statute of Anne, and Deene infers that they subsequently affected the Belgian debates over their first copyright statute. In the United States, the Copyright Clause of the United States Constitution and the first Federal copyright statute, the Copyright Act of 1790, both draw on the Statute of Anne. The 1790 act contains provisions for a 14-year term of copyright and sections that provide for authors who published their works before 1790, both of which mirror the protection offered by the statute 80 years previously.

== See also ==
- Licensing of the Press Act 1662
- Copyright Act 1911
- Copyright Act 1956
- Copyright, Designs and Patents Act 1988
- Copyright law of the United Kingdom
- Common law copyright

== Bibliography ==
- Abrams, Howard B. (1985). "The Historical Foundation of American Copyright Law: Exploding the Myth of Common Law Copyright". Wayne Law Review. 29 (3). Wayne State University Law School. ISSN 0043-1621.
- Alexander, Isabella (2010). Copyright Law and the Public Interest in the Nineteenth Century. Hart Publishing. ISBN 978-1-84113-786-5.
- Arber, Edward, ed. (1875). A Transcript of the Registers of the Company of Stationers of London (1554–1640). Vol. 2. London.
- Bently, Lionel (2010). The History of Copyright. Global Copyright: 300 Years Since the Statute of Anne, from 1709 to Cyberspace. Edward Elgar. ISBN 978-1-84980-831-6.
- Bracha, Oren (2010). "The Adventures of the Statute of Anne in the Land of Unlimited Possibilities: The Life of a Legal Transplant". Berkeley Technology Law Journal. 25 (1). UC Berkeley School of Law. ISSN 1086-3818. Archived from the original on 8 April 2018.
- Cornish, William (2010). The Statute of Anne 1709–10: Its Historical Setting. Global Copyright: 300 Years Since the Statute of Anne, from 1709 to Cyberspace. Edward Elgar. ISBN 978-1-84980-831-6.
- Deazley, Ronan (2003). "The Myth of Copyright at Common Law" (PDF). Cambridge Law Journal. 62 (1). Cambridge University Press: 106–133. doi:10.1017/S0008197303006251. ISSN 0008-1973. S2CID 146426672.
- Deazley, Ronan (2004). On the Origin of the Right to Copy. Hart Publishing. ISBN 978-1-84113-375-1.
- Deazley, Ronan (2006). Rethinking Copyright: History, Theory, Language. Edward Elgar Publishing. ISBN 978-1-84720-944-3.
- Deazley, Ronan (2010). "The Statute of Anne and the Great Abridgement Swindle". Houston Law Review. 47 (4). University of Houston Law Center. ISSN 0018-6694.
- Deene, Joris (2010). The Influence of the Statute of Anne on Belgian copyright law. Global Copyright: 300 Years Since the Statute of Anne, from 1709 to Cyberspace. Edward Elgar. ISBN 978-1-84980-831-6.
- Geiger, Christophe (2010). The Influence (Past and Present) of the Statute of Anne in France. Global Copyright: 300 Years Since the Statute of Anne, from 1709 to Cyberspace. Edward Elgar. ISBN 978-1-84980-831-6.
- Hauhart, Robert C. (1983). "The Origin and Development of the British and American Patent and Copyright Laws". Whittier Law Review. 5 (1). Whittier Law School. ISSN 0195-7643.
- Holdsworth, William (1920). "Press Control and Copyright in the 16th and 17th Centuries". Yale Law Journal. 29 (1). Yale Law School: 841–858. doi:10.2307/786947. ISSN 0044-0094. JSTOR 786947.
- Patterson, L. Ray; Joyce, Craig (2003). "Copyright in 1791: An Essay Concerning the Founders' View of Copyright Power Granted to Congress in Article 1. Section 8, Clause 8 of the U.S. Constitution". Emory Law Journal. 52 (1). Emory University School of Law. ISSN 0094-4076.
- Patterson, L. Ray (1965). "The Statute of Anne: Copyright Misconstrued". Harvard Journal on Legislation. 3 (1). Harvard Law School. ISSN 0017-808X.
- Robinson, A.J.K (1991). "The Evolution of Copyright, 1476–1776". Cambrian Law Review. 22 (1). University of Wales Press. ISSN 0084-8328.
- Rose, Mark (2009). "The Public Sphere and the Emergence of Copyright: Areopagitica, the Stationers' Company and the Statute of Anne". Tulane Journal of Technology and Intellectual Property. 12 (1). Tulane University Law School. ISSN 1533-3531.
- Rose, Mark (2003). "Nine-Tenths of the Law: The English Copyright Debates and the Rhetoric of the Public Domain". Law and Contemporary Problems. 66 (Spring). Duke University School of Law. ISSN 0023-9186.
- Rose, Mark (1993). Authors and owners: the invention of copyright. Harvard University Press. ISBN 978-0-674-05309-0.
- Seville, Catherine (2011). Literary Copyright Reform in Early Victorian England: The Framing of the 1842 Copyright Act. Cambridge University Press. ISBN 9780521174503.
- Seville, Catherine (2010). "The Statute of Anne: Rhetoric and Reception in the Nineteenth Century". Houston Law Review. 47 (4). University of Houston Law Center. ISSN 0018-6694.
- Streibich, Harold C. (1976). "The Moral Right of Ownership to Intellectual Property: Part II From the Age of Printing to the Future". University of Memphis Law Review. 7 (1). Cecil C. Humphreys School of Law. ISSN 1080-8582.
