= Hodgson Brothers v South African Railways and Harbours =

South African legal case

Hodgson Brothers v South African Railways and Harbours 1928 CPD 257 was an important case in the South African law of contract, which represented one of the first clear deployments of reliance theory or the doctrine of quasi-mutual assent.

== Facts ==
Hodgson Brothers, a small undertaking, informed South African Railways and Harbours that it had a lorry to sell for 500 pounds. Negotiations ensued between the parties during which was the price was not disputed at any stage. SA Railways made a complete and definite offer to buy the lorry. Hodgson Brothers received the offer and accepted by post. Five days later, however, SA Railways sent a telegram notifying Hodgson Brothers that it had forgotten in their prior negotiations to mention that it would only pay 300 pounds for the lorry. Hodgson Brothers refused to accept, arguing that they had already agreed on the price. SA Railways contended that it had made a mistake.

== Finding ==
Although the court held that there was no subjective meeting of the minds between the two parties,—no animus contrahendi, in other words—it found that South African Railways and Harbours, by its conduct, had created in the mind of Hodgson Brothers a reasonable belief that there was consensus, and therefore a contract had been formed; the contract accordingly was upheld.
