= Engraving Copyright Act 1734 =

Act of the Parliament of Great Britain

Engraving Copyright Act 1734 (Note: The citation of this act by this short title was authorised by section 1 of, and the first schedule to, the Short Titles Act 1896. Due to the repeal of those provisions it is now authorised by section 19(2) of the Interpretation Act 1978.)
- Act of Parliament
- Parliament of Great Britain
- Long title: An act for the encouragement of the arts of designing, engraving, and etching historical and other prints, by vesting the properties thereof in the inventors and engravers, during the time therein mentioned.
- Citation: 8 Geo. 2. c. 13
- Territorial extent: Great Britain

Dates
- Royal assent: 15 May 1735
- Commencement: 24 June 1735 (Note: Section 1.)
- Repealed: 1 July 1912

Other legislation
- Amends: Statute of Anne
- Amended by: Engraving Copyright Act 1766; Statute Law Revision Act 1867; Statute Law Revision Act 1887; Statute Law Revision Act 1888; Public Authorities Protection Act 1893
- Repealed by: Copyright Act 1911

Status: Repealed

Text of statute as originally enacted

The Engraving Copyright Act 1734 or Engravers' Copyright Act 1734 (8 Geo. 2. c. 13) was an act of the Parliament of Great Britain first read on 4 March 1734/35 and eventually passed on 25 June 1735 to give protections to producers of engravings. It is also called Hogarth's Act after William Hogarth, who prompted the law together with some fellow engravers. Historian Mark Rose notes, "The Act protected only those engravings that involved original designs and thus, implicitly, made a distinction between artists and mere craftsmen. Soon, however, Parliament was persuaded to extend protection to all engravings."

This act was one of the Copyright Acts 1734 to 1888.

== Subsequent developments ==
Section 3 of the act was repealed by section 2 of, and the schedule to, the Public Authorities Protection Act 1893 (56 & 57 Vict. c. 61), which came into force on 1 January 1894.

The whole act was repealed by sections 36 and 37(2) of, and the second schedule to, the Copyright Act 1911 (1 & 2 Geo. 5. c. 46), which came into force on 1 January 1912. The act replaced and consolidated existing copyright legislation.
