= Copyright Act 1911 =

Act of the Parliament of the United Kingdom

Copyright Act 1911 (Note: Section 37(1).)
- Act of Parliament
- Parliament of the United Kingdom
- Long title: An Act to amend and consolidate the Law relating to Copyright.
- Citation: 1 & 2 Geo. 5. c. 46
- Introduced by: Sydney Buxton (Second reading speech) (Commons); Viscount Haldane (Second reading speech) (Lords)
- Territorial extent: United Kingdom; Dominions; (Note: Section 25.)

Dates
- Royal assent: 16 December 1911
- Commencement: 1 July 1912 (Note: Section 37(2).)
- Repealed: 5 November 1956 (in the United Kingdom); 21 January 1958 (in India); 2 Jun 1962 (in Pakistan); 1 May 1969 (in Australia); 1 January 1979 (in South Africa); 10 April 1987 (in Singapore); 1 December 1987 (in Malaysia); 27 June 1997 (in Hong Kong); 25 May 2008 (in Israel); 24 May 2019 (final repeal, in Myanmar)
Other legislation
Amends	See § Repealed enactments
Repeals/revokes	See § Repealed enactments
Amended by	Copyright (British Museum) Act 1915; National Library of Scotland Act 1925; British Museum Act 1932; Law Reform (Married Women and Tortfeasors) Act 1935; Customs and Excise Act 1952; Federation of Malaya Independence Act 1957
Repealed by	Copyright Act 1956, Statute Law (Repeals) Act 1986 and Legal Deposit Libraries Act 2003 (in the United Kingdom); Copyright (Repeal of the Copyright Act 1911) (Jersey) Order 2012 (in Jersey); Copyright Act 1957 (in India); Copyright Ordinance, 1962 (in Pakistan); Copyright Act 1968 (in Australia); Copyright Act, 1978 (in South Africa); Copyright Act 1987 (in Singapore); Copyright Act 1987 (in Malaysia); Copyright Ordinance (Cap 528) (in Hong Kong); Copyright Law 5778-2007 (in Israel); Literary and Artistic Copyright Law 2019 (in Myanmar)

Status: Repealed

Text of statute as originally enacted

Revised text of statute as amended

The Copyright Act 1911 (1 & 2 Geo. 5. c. 46), also known as the Imperial Copyright Act 1911, was an act of the Parliament of the United Kingdom which received royal assent on 16 December 1911. The act established copyright law in the United Kingdom and the British Empire. The act amended existing UK copyright law, as recommended by a royal commission in 1878 and repealed all previous copyright legislation that had been in force in the UK. The act also implemented changes arising from the first revision of the Berne Convention for the Protection of Literary and Artistic Works in 1908.

The act came into force in the UK on 1 July 1912, in the Channel Islands (except Jersey) on 1 July 1912, in Jersey on 8 March 1913, and in the Isle of Man on 5 July 1912. The Copyright Act 1911 applied or extended to all parts of the British Empire. In India the act came into force on 30 October 1912 (with some modifications in terms of its application to Indian law enacted in 1914), in Burma (then a province of British India) on 24 February 1914, in Papua on 1 February 1931, and all other British possessions on 1 July 1912. It was subsequently enacted on various dates in the self-governing dominions and "territories under protection" of the British Empire. The Copyright Act 1911 (Extension to Palestine) Order 1924 (SR&O 1924/385) covered Mandatory Palestine and later the State of Israel, where in the latter it remained the governing statute until the Israeli Copyright Law 2007 took effect on 25 May 2008.

== Provisions ==
In the two centuries after the Statute of Anne of 1710, which afforded copyright protection to books, other works were afforded copyright protection either through case law, as in the case of music, or through acts of Parliament, as in the case of engravings, paintings, drawings and photographs, in legislation such as the Engraving Copyright Act 1734 (8 Geo. 2. c. 13) and the Fine Arts Copyright Act 1862 (25 & 26 Vict. c. 68).

The act consolidated previous copyright statutes, and apart from some minor exceptions, repealed all previous copyright legislation and established a single statute covering all forms of copyright.

The act implemented the Berne Convention, which abolished the common law copyright in unpublished works and responded to technological developments by conferring copyright on a new type of works not mentioned in the Berne Convention, namely sound recordings.

The act abolished the need for registration at the Stationers' Hall and provided that copyright is established upon the creation of a work. However, as the 1911 act came into effect at different times in different countries of the British Empire, registration at Stationers' Hall continued to be required in some Commonwealth countries after 1911. The act also stated that copyright arose in the act of creation, not the act of publishing.

The scope of copyright was further widened and producers of sound recordings were granted the exclusive right to prevent others reproducing their recordings, or playing them in public. The act provided that the copyright in literary, dramatic and music works could be infringed by the making of a film or other mechanical performance incorporating the copyrighted works.

In Israel, the bulk of amendments were made by the Knesset not to the 1911 act itself, but to the Copyright Ordinance 1924 that accompanied it, resulting in a situation in which the two legal instruments were in conflict – for instance, while the act set a copyright term of 50 years after the author's death, the ordinance set a term of 70. Because the Knesset did not amend the act to respond to further technological developments, the courts had to apply the act's definitions, which were centered on artistic works, or types of works not mentioned in it – for instance, phone books, newspapers, restaurant menus and even the codes of computer programs were legally deemed "books" for copyright purposes, regardless of their (usually nonexistent) artistic value. These "stretched-boundaries" definitions are maintained in the Copyright Law 5778–2007.

The last country of the former British Empire to repeal the 1911 act was Myanmar, whose parliament ratified a new, unified copyright law on 24 May 2019, repealing both the said act as well as the Burma Merchandise Marks Act of 1889 and an outdated definition of "trademark" from the Burma Penal Code of 1861.

== Summary of changes ==
British lawyer Evan James MacGillivray summarised the changes in the introduction of his annotated edition of the act as follows:

The principal changes which the act will effect upon the existing law may be briefly summarised —

1. Extension of the term of copyright to life and fifty years (Subject to certain exceptions).
2. Provision that the last twenty-five years of the term of copyright shall be unassignable by the author during his lifetime.
3. Provision that during the last twenty-five years any person may reproduce a work without consent on payment of a ten per cent royalty.
4. Exclusive right of dramatising and translating secured to the author.
5. Dramatic works entitled to protection include pieces in dumb show, ballets and cinematograph productions, and the copyright is infringed by the making or exhibiting of unauthorised cinematograph films.
6. Subject to the right in certain circumstances of making records upon payment of a royalty, the composer of a musical composition gets the sole right of adapting his composition for use upon mechanical instruments.
7. Subject to limitations in respect of remedies, and to the right of making paintings, drawings, engravings or photographs of any architectural work, architectural works are included among artistic works entitled to protection.
8. Taking of short passages for insertion in school books is permitted.
9. Subject to conditions and limitations, an exclusive right of oral delivery is conferred in respect of non-dramatic works, such as lectures, speeches and sermons.
10. Summary remedies, hitherto confined to infringements of musical works, are made applicable to all classes of works, and to infringements of performing rights, but the remedies are not so complete as in the case of musical works.
11. The National Library of Wales is, subject to limitations, included as one of the libraries entitled to free copies of books from the publishers.
12. Copyright subsists from the time a work is created, the condition of protection being, in the case of an unpublished work, that the author is a British subject or resident, and in the case of a published work, that it was first published within the dominions to which the act applies.
13. Common law right in unpublished works is abrogated, but in the case of a literary, dramatic, or musical work, or an engraving, copyright subsists until publication notwithstanding the expiration of the period of life and fifty years, and if publication is posthumous, then for fifty years after publication.
14. No copyright vests in the proprietor of a collective work unless the author is employed under a contract of service or apprenticeship, or there is an assignment in writing; and when the copyright vests in the proprietor of a periodical by reason of a contract of service or apprenticeship, the author may restrain separate publication.
15. The passing of the copyright by reason of the work having been executed on commission is confined to the cases of engravings, photographs and portraits.
16. The self-governing dominions are given a free hand in copyright matters. Each dominion may adopt or reject the Imperial Act as it pleases. Similarly, each dominion may adhere to the Revised Convention or to the original Berne Convention, or it may decline to adhere to either, and so place itself in the position of a non-union country.

=== Repealed enactments ===
Section 36 of the act repealed 21 enactments, listed in the second schedule to the act.

Citation	Short title	Extent of repeal
8 Geo. 2. c. 13	Engraving Copyright Act 1734	The whole act.
7 Geo. 3. c. 38	Engraving Copyright Act 1767	The whole act.
15 Geo. 3. c. 53	Copyright Act 1775	The whole act.
17 Geo. 3. c. 57	Prints Copyright Act 1777	The whole act.
54 Geo. 3. c. 56	Sculpture Copyright Act 1814	The whole act.
3 & 4 Will. 4. c. 15	Dramatic Copyright Act 1833	The whole act.
5 & 6 Will. 4. c. 65	Lectures Copyright Act 1835	The whole act.
6 & 7 Will. 4. c. 59	Prints and Engravings Copyright (Ireland) Act 1836	The whole act.
6 & 7 Will. 4. c. 110	Copyright Act 1836	The whole act.
5 & 6 Vict. c. 45	Copyright Act 1842	The whole act.
7 & 8 Vict. c. 12	International Copyright Act 1844	The whole act.
10 & 11 Vict. c. 95	Colonial Copyright Act 1847	The whole act.
15 & 16 Vict. c. 12	International Copyright Act 1852	The whole act.
25 & 26 Vict. c. 68	Fine Arts Copyright Act 1862	Sections one to six. In section eight the words "and pursuant to any Act for the protection of copyright engravings," and "and in any such Act as aforesaid,." Sections nine to twelve.
38 & 39 Vict. c. 12	International Copyright Act 1875	The whole act.
39 & 40 Vict. c. 36	Customs Consolidation Act 1876	Section forty-two, from "Books wherein" to "such copyright will expire." Sections forty-four, forty-five, and one hundred and fifty-two.
45 & 46 Vict. c. 40	Copyright (Musical Compositions) Act 1882	The whole act.
49 & 50 Vict. c. 33	International Copyright Act 1886	The whole act.
51 & 52 Vict. c. 17	Copyright (Musical Compositions) Act 1888	The whole act.
52 & 53 Vict. c. 42	Revenue Act 1889	Section one, from "Books first published" to "as provided in that section."
6 Edw. 7. c. 36	Musical Copyright Act 1906	In section three the words "and which has been registered in accordance with the provisions of the Copyright Act, 1841, or of the International Copyright Act, 1844, which registration may be effected notwithstanding anything in the International Copyright Act, 1886."

== Imperial copyright act ==
Cover page of the British Copyright Act 1911, also known as the Imperial Copyright Act 1911. "Part I Imperial Copyright. Rights. 1.(1) Subject to the provisions of this Act, copyright shall subsist throughout the parts of His Majesty’s dominions to which this Act extends for the term hereinafter mentioned in every original literary dramatic music and artists work, if..."

With the exception of provisions that were expressly restricted to the United Kingdom by the act, all provisions of the Copyright Act 1911 applied "throughout His Majesty's dominions" and self-governing dominions if enacted by the parliament of that dominion without modifications that were not necessary to adapt the act "to the circumstances of the dominion". The Copyright Act 1911 was adapted to circumstances and enacted by the then self-governing dominions of Australia (Copyright Act 1912), Newfoundland (the 1912 Copyright Act) and the Union of South Africa (Patents, Designs, Trade Marks and Copyright Act 1916). The Copyright Act 1911 also provided that the UK Secretary of State could certify copyright laws passed in any self-governing dominion if the copyright legislation was “substantially identical” to those of the Copyright Act 1911. Though the Secretary of State could certify copyright law even if their provisions on copyright enforcement and the restriction on importation of works manufactured in “foreign countries” were not identical to that of the Copyright Act 1911. Such self-governing dominions were then treated as if the Copyright Act 1911 extended to the self-governing dominion. The Secretary of State certified the copyright laws of New Zealand (New Zealand Copyright Act 1913, certified April 1914) and Canada (Copyright Act of Canada 1921, certified 1924).

The act also provided that “His Majesty may, by Order in Council, extend this Act to any territories under his protection and to Cyprus” and the act would then apply to these countries as if they were dominions of the British Empire. In 1912 an Order in Council extended the Copyright Act 1911 to Cyprus and the following territories: Bechuanaland, East Africa, The Gambia, the Gilbert and Ellice Islands, Northern Nigeria, the Northern Territories of the Gold Coast, Nyasaland, Northern Rhodesia, Southern Rhodesia, Sierra Leone, Somaliland, Southern Nigeria, the Solomon Islands, Swaziland, Uganda and Weihaiwei. The Copyright Act 1911 was extended to Palestine by an Order in Council in 1924, it was extended to Tanganyika by an Order in Council in 1924 and 1931, it was extended to the Federated Malay States by an Order in Council in 1931 and 1932, and it was extended to the Cameroons under British Mandate by an Order in Council in 1933.

== Influence ==
The act provided the template for an approach to copyright exceptions where a specific list of exceptions carefully defines permitted uses of the copyrighted work. The act formed the basis of UK copyright law and, as an imperial measure, formed the basis for copyright law in most of what were then British colonies and dominions. While many of these countries have had their own copyright law for a considerable number of years, most have followed the imperial model developed in 1911. Australia, Canada, India, New Zealand, Singapore and South Africa define the limits on and exceptions to copyright by providing an exhaustive list of specifically defined exceptions.

=== Commonwealth approach to exceptions ===
This "Commonwealth approach" to copyright is in contrast with that adopted in US copyright law. US copyright does contain a number of specific exceptions, as well as providing for a fair use defence in section 107 of the Copyright Act 1976. The Section provides a list of illustrative example of uses under this defence, such as criticism, comment and research. In contrast to the Commonwealth fair dealing exceptions, the fair use defence allows US courts to find that a defendant's use is fair and hence not an infringement of copyright, even though the use does not fall within the statutory list provided for in Section 107.

== Subsequent developments ==
The whole act, except sections 15, 34, and 37, was repealed for the United Kingdom by section 50(2) of, and the ninth schedule to, the Copyright Act 1956 (4 & 5 Eliz. 2. c. 74), which came into force on 1 June 1957.

Sections 34 and 37(2) of the act was subsequently repealed for the United Kingdom by section 1(1) of, and part VI of schedule 1 to, the Statute Law (Repeals) Act 1986, which received royal assent on 2 May 1986.

Section 15 of the act was repealed for the United Kingdom by section 16(1) of, and the schedule to, the Legal Deposit Libraries Act 2003, which came into force on 1 February 2004.

Section 37(1), which provides the act's short title, is the only unrepealed provision of the act, meaning that the act is treated as repealed for the United Kingdom.

== See also ==
- Crown copyright
- Copyright Act 1842
- Copyright Act 1956
- Copyright, Designs and Patents Act 1988
- Copyright law of the United Kingdom
