= South African Railways & Harbours Administration =

The South African Railways & Harbours Administration (SAR&H) was established on 31 May 1910 with formation of the Union of South Africa by the amalgamation of the four colonial railways and all harbours in South Africa - about 11,000 kilometres of track. It would manage road transport and pipelines in South Africa. It also managed South African Airways from 1934 to 1997. It was reorganised and renamed in 1981 as the South African Transport Services (SATS). In 1990 it became Transnet.

== History ==
Prior to the creation of the Union of South Africa on 31 May 1910, South Africa consisted of four colonies of the Cape, Orange River, Natal and Transvaal. The formation of the union resulted in the railways and harbours of the colonies being amalgamated under one organisation. The Central South African Railways, the Cape Government Railways, and the Natal Government Railways were all fused by an Act of Parliament. The South African Railways and Harbours Service Act, 1912 made striking by railway employees punishable by fine or imprisonment.

The Hodgson Brothers v South African Railways and Harbours (1928 CPD 257) dispute in 1928 was an important case of contract law. By 1922, the railways in South West Africa and its harbour at Lüderitz came under the control of the SAR&H and the total track under its control was 17,885 kilometres. When South African Airways formed in the 1930s, it too was controlled by the SARHA.

== Governance ==
The SAR&H was owned and controlled by the South African state and managed as a government department by the Minister of Transport and the Department of Transport. SAR&H was governed by the Railways and Harbours Board which comprised a chairman, the Minister of Transport, and three commissioners. The operational side of SAR&H was run by a general manager, with two deputies, and nine assistant general managers managing the various branches.

== Employment ==
=== Labour policies ===
In 1924 as a result of the industrial depression, the government adopted a "civilised labour" policy, the intention of which was to ensure that the European minority did not sink below the level of the non-European workers. Unskilled white labour was recruited to the railways and a probation grade introduced, restricted to white employees. The number of black employees fell from 47,157 in 1924 to 41,533 in 1929, while the number of white employees increased from 39,024 to 58,562. This policy continued until 1939. Die Spoorbund, an Afrikaner trade union formed in 1934, advocated a policy of replacing all black railway workers by Afrikaners.

Most of the black workers were migrants, housed in company labour compounds. In 1936, starting pay for single black workers was 3/6d a day and for coloured workers 4/-d a day. After 11 years, pay rose to 4/6d for black and 5/- for coloured workers. Married workers got between 4d and 6d more per day. 28,000 of the 45,000 employed were casual day labourers. Dock workers were often required to "stand by" waiting for a ship to arrive.

The South African Railways and Harbours Union was formed after a meeting of the staff in Cape Town on 1 April 1936 addressed by Rachel Simons.

In 1939, the organisation had 47,000 African employees.

The railways were a stronghold of the National Party. A special white labourer grade was created for Afrikaners from which most were eventually promoted.

In 1962, there were 218,000 employees, of which about 100,000 were Africans. About a third of the Africans were officially casual workers, paid a daily rate with no leave, pension rights of marriage allowance. The remainder were mostly temporary workers who were eligible for 15 days paid leave. Permanent workers were in addition entitled to a marriage allowance and a pension at the age of 60.

== Reorganisation ==
=== South African Transport Services ===
From April 1981, the country's railway, harbour, road transport, aviation, and pipeline operations became known as South African Transport Services. At the same time, the enterprise was restructured into units and divisions with strong emphasis placed on localized management.

In 1984, the organisation had 240,237 employees, of which 110,160 were African, 109,710 were White, 18,377 Coloured, and 1,990 Indian. Wages were then not much worse than in other industries, but migrant workers, the majority, were forced to live in hostels or compounds in primitive conditions. The Delmore hostel near Germiston had 7,000 beds. Workers shared a room with four or five other men. There was no hot water. Visitors were not allowed. Food was supplied from a communal kitchen. It had 77% of the GDP of the transport sector in South Africa. Industrial relations were regulated by the Conditions of Employment (South African Transport Services) Act, 1983. Black workers were still regarded as labourers even if in skilled work. Benefits available to white workers were denied to them and they were subject to arbitrary and oppressive sanctions.

By 1987, numbers employed had declined to about 199,000.

=== Transnet ===
The Legal Succession to the South African Transport Services Act, 1989 transformed the South African Transport Services from a government department into a public company. On 1 April 1990, after 80 years of government and parliamentary control, SATS received company status. It is now known as Transnet.
