= Copyright Act 1842 =

Act of the Parliament of the United Kingdom

Copyright Act 1842 (Note: The citation of this act by this short title was authorised by section 1 of, and the first schedule to, the Short Titles Act 1896. Due to the repeal of those provisions it is now authorised by section 19(2) of the Interpretation Act 1978.)
- Act of Parliament
- Parliament of the United Kingdom
- Long title: An Act to amend the Law of Copyright.
- Citation: 5 & 6 Vict. c. 45
- Territorial extent: United Kingdom; Dominions; (Note: Section 2.)

Dates
- Royal assent: 1 July 1842
- Commencement: 1 July 1842 (Note: The Acts of Parliament (Commencement) Act 1793.)
- Repealed: 1 July 1912
Other legislation
Amends	Dramatic Copyright Act 1833
Repeals/revokes	Copyright Act 1709; Copyright Act 1801
Amended by	Statute Law Revision Act 1874 (No. 2); Public Authorities Protection Act 1893
Repealed by	Copyright Act 1911

Status: Repealed

Text of statute as originally enacted

The Copyright Act 1842 (5 & 6 Vict. c. 45) was an act of the Parliament of the United Kingdom, which received royal assent on 1 July 1842 and was repealed in 1911. It revised and consolidated the copyright law of the United Kingdom.

It was one of the Copyright Acts 1734 to 1888. (Note: The Short Titles Act 1896, section 2(1) and Schedule 2.)

== Duration of copyright ==
It provided that in future the copyright of every book published in the lifetime of its author would endure for the remainder of the author's life and for a further seven years after their death. If this period was less than forty-two years from the first publication, then the copyright would persist for a full forty-two years regardless of the date of their death. Any work published after the author's death would remain the copyright of the owner of the manuscript for the same forty-two year period.

Where copyright already existed in a work under earlier legislation, it was to be extended to that provided for by the new act, except that if the copyright had been sold (Note: As the Companion tactfully put it, in cases "where it shall belong to an assignee for other considerations than natural love and affection.") it would lapse at the end of the present term of copyright, unless an extension was agreed to by both the proprietor and the author. This ensured that authors would have the opportunity to be compensated for the fact that rights they had sold some years previously, possibly for a fixed sum, had become substantially more valuable.

In an early form of a compulsory license, the Privy Council was given the authority to authorize the republication of any book which the proprietor refused to publish after the death of the author.

Copyright in encyclopaedias, magazines, periodicals, and series works was to be vested in the proprietors as though they were themselves the authors, saving that essays, articles, etc. first published as part of a collected periodical work, the republication right was to revert to the original author after twenty-eight years and continue for the remainder of the term.

The act extended to dramatic works, previously covered by the Dramatic Copyright Act 1833, and to their "right of representation" (Note: The right to license them for performance.) which was to have the same term as copyright. The copyright and the right of representation of a dramatic work could be assigned separately. The act also extended to musical works, and extended the provisions of the 1833 Act to cover such works.

Copyrights were declared to be personal property, and thus capable of bequest.

== Library deposit and registration ==
One copy of any book printed after the act came into force (Note: And of any subsequent edition which had significant additions) was to be submitted within one month of publication to the British Museum, at the expense of the publisher. The Bodleian Library, Cambridge University Library, the Advocates' Library and the Trinity College Library, Dublin, were all empowered to demand copies, which were to be delivered within a month of receiving the demand.

A registry of copyrights was to be kept at Stationers' Hall, and an entry was to be taken as prima facie proof of proprietorship; an assignation of copyright recorded in the register was to be considered as having the force of a legal deed. Entry in the register was a necessary precondition to suing under the act, but an omission did not affect the legal title, simply the ability to sue.

== Copyright infringement ==
Any illegal copies of work were forfeit, to become the property of the proprietor of the copyright, and could be recovered from their publisher by legal action. All editions published outside British jurisdiction were illegal; only the copyright proprietor was permitted to import them, and any unauthorized imports were likewise forfeit. Any illegally imported copies could be seized by customs agents, and fined on conviction at a rate of £10 plus double the value of each copy of the book.

The act extended throughout the British Empire.

== Carlyle's petition ==
Thomas Carlyle wrote a famous petition on the bill, published in the Examiner 7 April 1839.

. . . That all useful labor is worthy of recompense; that all honest labor is worthy of the chance of recompense; that the giving and assuring to each man what recompense his labor has actually merited, may be said to be the business of all Legislation, Polity, Government, and Social Arrangement whatsoever among men;—a business indispensable to attempt, impossible to accomplish accurately, difficult to accomplish without inaccuracies that become enormous, unsupportable, and the parent of Social Confusions which never altogether end. . . .
. . . That your petitioner cannot discover himself to have done unlawfully in this his said labor of writing books, or to have become criminal, or have forfeited the law's protection thereby. Contrariwise your petitioner believes firmly that he is innocent in said labor; that if he be found in the long run to have written a genuine enduring book, his merit therein, and desert towards England and English and other men, will be considerable, not easily estimable in money; that on the other hand, if his book prove false and ephemeral, he and it will be abolished and forgotten, and no harm done. That, in this manner, your petitioner plays no unfair game against the world; his stake being life itself, so to speak (for the penalty is death by starvation), and the world's stake nothing till once it see the dice thrown; so that in any case the world cannot lose. . . .

== Subsequent developments ==
Section 26 of the act was repealed by section 2 of, and the schedule to, the Public Authorities Protection Act 1893 (56 & 57 Vict. c. 61), which came into force on 1 January 1894.

The whole act was repealed by sections 36 and 37(2) of, and the second schedule to, the Copyright Act 1911 (1 & 2 Geo. 5. c. 46), which came into force on 1 January 1912. The act replaced and consolidated existing copyright legislation

== See also ==
- Statute of Anne, the Copyright Act 1710, which preceded it
- Copyright Act 1911, which succeeded it
- Copyright Act 1956
- Copyright, Designs and Patents Act 1988
