= Copyright law of Myanmar =

Copyright Law 2019

Pyidaungsu Hluttaw
- Long title: The Pyidaungsu Hluttaw Law No. 15/2019
- Territorial extent: Myanmar
- Enacted: 24 May 2019
- Assented to: 24 May 2019
- Commenced: 31 October 2023

Repeals
- Burma Copyright Act, 1914 (repealed)

Summary
- To protect the rights of authors, performers, and producers of literary, artistic, and related works, promote creative production, and align Myanmar's copyright regime with international standards.
- Status: In force

Trademarks Law 2019

Pyidaungsu Hluttaw
- Long title: Pyidaungsu Hluttaw Law No. 3/2019
- Territorial extent: Myanmar
- Enacted: 30 January 2019
- Assented to: 30 January 2019
- Commenced: 1 April 2023

Related legislation
- Merchandise Marks Act 1889 (superseded); Industrial Design Law 2019; Copyright Law 2019; Patent Law 2019

Summary
- To establish a comprehensive framework for trademark registration and protection, promote investment and fair competition, prevent counterfeit goods, and align Myanmar's trademark regime with international standards like the TRIPS Agreement.
- Status: In force

The basic laws on copyright in Myanmar are Pyidaungsu Hluttaw Law No. 15/2019 (passed 14 May 2019 and effective 14 May 2020, sometimes known as the Copyright and Arbitration Act) and Pyidaungsu Hluttaw Law No. 3/2019 (passed January 30, 2019, sometimes known as simply the "Trademarks Law"). Burma has not signed the Berne Convention, but it has signed the TRIPS Agreement of the World Trade Organization. Burma is a member of the World Intellectual Property Organization (WIPO). Related and subsequent amending copyright legislation are listed by WIPO as well.

The main overseer for copyright is the Intellectual Property Department, and for registering trademarks the Office of Registration of Deeds. Prior to the 2019 law going into force, formal copyright registration procedures had never been instituted since the country's independence.

Prior to the 2019 law going into force, copyright in Myanmar was governed under the British Copyright Act 1911 (promulgated by the Burma Copyright Act, 1914 and sometimes known as the 1914 act) and the Merchandise Marks Act 1889, both instituted when the country was part of the British Empire.

On 18 October 2023, State Administration Council announced the effective date of the Copyright Law as 31 October 2023.
