= Berkeley Technology Law Journal =

- The Fall 2006 issue of BTLJ.
- Discipline: Law
- Language: English

Publication details
- Former name: High Technology Law Journal
- History: 1986 to present
- Publisher: UC Berkeley School of Law (United States)
- Frequency: Quarterly

Standard abbreviations
- Bluebook: Berkeley Tech. L.J.
- ISO 4: Berkeley Technol. Law J.

Indexing
- ISSN: 1086-3818

The Berkeley Technology Law Journal (BTLJ) is a law journal published at the University of California, Berkeley School of Law. It started publication in Spring 1986 as the High Technology Law Journal and changed its name to BTLJ in 1996. The journal covers emerging issues of law in the areas of intellectual property, cyber law, information law, and biotechnology, as well as antitrust and telecommunications law. The journal appears quarterly and its membership typically includes over 100 students. The Journal was ranked 45 among 1605 law journals in the Washington and Lee University School of Law's journal ranking list.

The Annual Review of Law and Technology is a distinctive issue of the Journal published in collaboration with the Berkeley Center for Law and Technology, dedicated to student-written case notes and comments discussing the most important recent developments in intellectual property, antitrust, cyberlaw, telecommunications, biotechnology, and business law from the past year. In addition, BTLJ co-sponsors an annual symposium on an emerging area of technology law each Spring.
