= Legal Succession to the South African Transport Services Act, 1989 =

The Legal Succession to the South African Transport Services Act, was an Act of the South African Parliament in 1989.

It transformed the South African Transport Services from a government department into a public company.
