= Conditions of Employment (South African Transport Services) Act, 1983 =

The Conditions of Employment (South African Transport Services) Act, was an Act of the South African Parliament passed in 1983.

It provided that employees of the South African Transport Services were prohibited from striking. Industrial disputes were referred to a Joint Conciliation Board appointed by the Minister of Transport.
