= Copyright law of South Africa =

Governs the right to control the use and distribution of artistic and creative works

The copyright law of South Africa governs copyright, the right to control the use and distribution of artistic and creative works, in the Republic of South Africa. It is embodied in the Copyright Act, 1978 and its various amendment acts, and administered by the Companies and Intellectual Property Commission in the Department of Trade and Industry.

As of June 2026, a major amendment to the law in the Copyright Amendment Bill, B13F of 2017, had been approved by the South African Parliament in February 2024, but held to be unconstitutional by the Constitutional Court due to one set of its exceptions for educational institutions constituting an arbitrary deprivation of property, in a judgement handed down on 26 June 2026 following its referral by the President for concerns about, amongst others, the constitutionality of its "fair use" clause and its exceptions for translation, education and libraries. The Constitutional Court's hearing of the President's referral, in May 2025, heard arguments from the President, two political parties (the Democratic Alliance and the Freedom Front Plus) and numerous interested persons and organisations. The President is therefore constrained from signing the Bill into law in terms of section 79(5) of the Constitution of the Republic of South Africa, and must refer the Bill back to Parliament.

South Africa is a party to the Berne Convention and the TRIPS Agreement. It has signed, but not ratified, the WIPO Copyright Treaty and the WIPO Performances and Phonograms Treaty. It has not signed or acceded to the Marrakesh Treaty for Persons Who Are Blind, Visually Impaired or Otherwise Print Disabled.

== History ==
Initially, after the creation of the Union of South Africa in 1910, the copyright laws of the four formerly-independent provinces continued unchanged. In 1916, Parliament enacted the Patents, Designs, Trade Marks and Copyright Act, 1916, which repealed the various provincial laws and incorporated the British Imperial Copyright Act 1911 into South African law. In 1928, along with the other British dominions, South Africa became a party to the Berne Convention in its own right.

After South Africa became a republic in 1961, Parliament enacted its own copyright law, separate from that of the United Kingdom, in the Copyright Act, 1965. Nonetheless, this act was largely based on the British Copyright Act 1956. In 1978 it was replaced by the Copyright Act, 1978, which (as amended), remains in force. The 1978 Act draws both from British law and from the text of the Berne Convention. It has been amended several times, most notably in 1992 to make computer programs a distinct class of protected work, and in 1997 to bring it into line with the TRIPS Agreement.

In September 2021, the Gauteng High Court held that the 1978 Copyright Act is unconstitutional because it does not give adequate freedom for blind and visually impaired readers to translate a work into Braille or other accessible formats, and hence discriminates against people with visual impairment. The applicant, the nonprofit organisation Blind SA, estimated that fewer than 0.5% of published books are available in Braille. The Constitutional Court of South Africa, in September 2022, confirmed the finding of unconstitutionality by the lower court, as was required by section 172(2)(d) of the Constitution of the Republic of South Africa, but varied its order, ordering that the finding of unconstitutionality be suspended for 24 months until September 2024 and that a new provision that it drafted based on the requirements of the Marrakesh Treaty be read into the Copyright Act during the suspension period, thereby giving Parliament the opportunity to amend the Act to cure its unconstitutionality. At the end of the suspension period, the amendment of the Act with a disability exception had been passed by Parliament but not signed into law by the President. Blind SA therefore instituted another legal action, this time directly to the Constitutional Court, resulting in the Court ordering in May 2025 that the provisions of the disability exception in the Copyright Amendment Bill, B13F of 2017, be read into the Act until such time as the Act is amended.

== Eligibility for copyright ==
The Copyright Act defines nine classes of work that are eligible for copyright:

- literary works - including novels, poems, plays, film scripts, textbooks, articles, encyclopedias, reports, speeches, etc.
- musical works - excluding words sung with the music
- artistic works - including paintings, sculptures, drawings, photographs, architectural works, works of craftsmanship, etc.
- cinematograph films - in any medium, including film, tape or digital data
- sound recordings - in any medium, but excluding film soundtracks
- broadcasts - signals transmitted by radio waves and intended for public reception
- programme-carrying signals - signals representing audio and/or video and transmitted via satellite
- published editions - particular typographical arrangements of literary or musical works
- computer programs - instructions, in any medium, that direct the operation of a computer

For a work to be eligible for copyright, it must be original, and it must have been written down or recorded in some way (except for broadcasts and programme-carrying signals, which must have been broadcast or transmitted, respectively). "Originality" requires the work to have been produced by the exercise of skill and effort by the author(s). As in all Berne Convention countries, copyright is automatic and does not require registration.

The Copyright Act automatically protects works created by South Africans or in South Africa. It also permits the Minister of Trade and Industry to extend the same protection to works created in, or by residents of, other countries; such protection has been extended to all Berne Convention countries.

== Copyright term ==
For literary, musical and artistic works, except for photographs, the copyright term in South Africa is fifty years from the end of the year of the author's death, or fifty years from publication if it is first published after the author's death. For photographs, films and computer programs, the term is fifty years from first publication, or fifty years from creation if not published within fifty years. For sound recordings, broadcasts, programme-carrying signals and published editions, it is fifty years from first publication or transmission.

Anonymous works are protected for the shorter of fifty years from first publication or fifty years from the year when it is reasonable to presume the author is dead. For works with multiple authors, the fifty years from death are calculated from the death of the last author to die. Government works are protected for fifty years from first publication.

== Commissioned works ==
Generally, ownership of a protected work vests in the author of the work. Section 21(1)(c) of the Act, however, creates a statutory default vesting copyright in certain works in the party commissioning the work rather than in the author.

Section 21(1)(c) states:

"(c) Where a person commissions the taking of a photograph, the painting or drawing of a portrait, the making of a gravure, the making of a cinematograph film or the making of a sound recording and pays or agrees to pay for it in money or money's worth, and the work is made in pursuance of that commission, such person shall, subject to the provisions of paragraph (b), be the owner of any copyright subsisting therein by virtue of section 3 or 4."

== Exclusive rights of copyright ==
Sections 6, 7, 8, 9, 10, 11, 11A and 11B of the Act set out the exclusive rights of copyright in the respective classes of works that are eligible for copyright. These exclusive rights are a closed list of exclusive rights to do or to authorize the doing of certain acts in respect of those works in South Africa, which acts are often referred to as “restricted acts”.

These rights vest in the owner of the copyright in the respective work. If a person other than the copyright owner wishes to undertake a restricted act in respect of a given work protected by copyright and that act is not covered by an exception (see below), that person must obtain the permission (i.e. authorization) of the copyright owner or the owner’s authorized agent. The owner or their agent could grant permission against payment. It is therefore copyright’s requirement for the owner’s authorization to carry out a restricted act with their work that triggers the potential for remuneration of the owner for the use of their work. Carrying out a restricted act without this authorization or licence constitutes an infringement of copyright.

The most notable restricted acts are the following:

1. Reproducing the work in any manner or form. This is a restricted act in respect of all classes of copyright work, other than programme-carrying signals.
2. Publishing a literary, musical or artistic work or a computer program if it was hitherto unpublished.
3. Performing a literary or musical work or a computer program in public, causing a cinematograph film to be seen in public, or communicating a sound recording to the public.
4. Broadcasting a literary or musical work or a film or a sound recording or a computer program or rebroadcasting an earlier broadcast.
5. Causing a literary or musical work or a film or a sound recording or a broadcast or a computer program to be transmitted in a diffusion service (other than a diffusion service operated by the original broadcaster that had transmitted a lawful television broadcast containing the artistic work).
6. Including an artistic work in a film or television broadcast and causing a television or other programme that includes the artistic work to be transmitted in a diffusion service (other than a diffusion service operated by the original broadcaster that had transmitted a lawful television broadcast containing the artistic work).
7. Making an adaptation of a literary, musical or artistic work or of a film or of a computer program, and doing in relation to an adaptation, any of the restricted acts set out above that apply to that class of work.
8. Letting or offering or exposing for hire by way of trade, a copy of a film, sound recording or computer program.

The Constitutional Court, in September 2022, declared sections 6 and 7, read with section 23 of the Act, as unconstitutional, invalid and inconsistent with the constitutional rights of persons with visual and print disabilities, to the extent that those provisions limit the access of such persons to published literary works, and artistic works as may be included in such literary works, in accessible format copies. The declaration of unconstitutionality was suspended until September 2024 to allow remedial legislation to pass, which did not happen. As of July 2025, this limited declaration of the unconstitutionality of the exclusive rights relating to literary and artistic works must be considered to be in effect.

South Africa’s Act does not grant an exclusive right of distribution of copyright works (envisaged by article 6 of the WIPO Copyright Treaty), but certain acts of distribution of copyright works “without the licence of the copyright owner” nevertheless constitutes an infringement of copyright. It also does not grant copyright owners the exclusive rights of “communication to the public of their works, by wire or wireless means” and “the making available to the public of their works in such a way that members of the public may access these works from a place and at a time individually chosen by them” (envisaged by article 8 of the WIPO Copyright Treaty). These exclusive rights are proposed to be introduced by the Copyright Amendment Bill, 2017, which bill is, as of July 2025, before the Constitutional Court for the consideration of the constitutionality of other provisions.

== Limitations and exceptions ==
The exclusive rights granted by copyright are subject to specific and general limitations and exceptions permitting certain uses of works without permission of the owner of the copyright.

=== Fair dealing ===
Like most Commonwealth countries with a legal system derived from UK law, the South African Copyright Act contains a general exception for "fair dealing" with a copyrighted work.

Section 12(1) of the Act states:

"12.- (1) Copyright shall not be infringed by any fair dealing with a literary or musical work-

(a) for the purposes of research or private study by, or the personal or private use of, the person using the work;

(b) for the purposes of criticism or review of that work or of another work; or

(c) for the purpose of reporting current events-

(i) in a newspaper, magazine or similar periodical; or

(ii) by means of broadcasting or in a cinematograph film:

Provided that, in the case of paragraphs (b) and (c)(i), the source shall be mentioned, as well as the name of the author if it appears on the work."

The factors determining what is a "fair" dealing is not defined in the Act. The only reported judgment of the South African courts that considered a test for fair dealing is Moneyweb (Pty) Ltd v Media24 Limited and Another (2016), where the Court opined that "Fairness is an elastic concept. A determination of 'fair dealing' involves a value judgment and will depend on the particular facts or circumstances at the time of dealing."

Fair dealing exceptions for literary and musical works in section 12 are extended selectively to other copyright works by sections 15, 16, 17, 18, 19A and 19B. Thus there is no fair dealing exception to reproduce cinematograph films or sound recordings "for the purposes of research or private study by, or the personal or private use of, the person using the work."

None of the fair dealing exceptions are remunerated exceptions. In other words, if a fair dealing exception applies to a given use, the permission of the copyright owner is not required and the Act does not require the copyright owner to be compensated for that use.

=== Other limitations and exceptions ===
In addition to the general fair dealing exceptions, South Africa has a number of specific limitations and exceptions in sections 12(2)-(13) and 14 to 19B of the Act.

Section 13 empowers the responsible Minister to introduce exceptions to the reproduction right by regulation, as in chapter 1 of the Copyright Regulations, 1978.

=== Quotation ===
Section 12(3) states:

"The copyright […] shall not be infringed by any quotation therefrom, including any quotation from articles in newspapers or periodicals that are in the form of summaries of any such work: Provided that the quotation shall be compatible with fair practice, that the extent thereof shall not exceed the extent justified by the purpose and that the source shall be mentioned, as well as the name of the author if it appears on the work."

The South African quotation exception is notable in being open to a quotation for any purpose. The quotation exception can only apply to an extract of a work—not to use of a full work, such as a photograph.

=== Illustration for teaching ===
Section 12(4) provides for an exception for use of copyrighted work “by way of illustration […] for teaching”:

"The copyright in a literary or musical work shall not be infringed by using such work, to the extent justified by the purpose, by way of illustration in any publication, broadcast or sound or visual record for teaching: Provided that such use shall be compatible with fair practice and that the source shall be mentioned, as well as the name of the author if it appears on the work."

=== Incidental inclusion of artisic works in films and broadcasts ===
Section 15(1) states:

"15(1) The copyright in an artistic work shall not be infringed by its inclusion in a cinematograph film or a television broadcast or transmission in a diffusion service, if such inclusion is merely by way of background, or incidental, to the principal matters represented in the film, broadcast or transmission."

This exception is limited to the capture of “an artistic work” in certain other works.

Section 1 of the Act defines “artistic work” narrowly, as including “(a) paintings, sculptures, drawings, engravings and photographs; (b) works of architecture, being either buildings or models of buildings; or (c) works of craftsmanship […]”. Thus, this exception would permit the filming of a building or sculpture in the background of a scene. But the definition in section 1 excludes music, film or broadcast footage, as well as literary texts. It would not authorize the capture of music playing on a radio, a programme playing on a television set, or even the capture of a literary text such as an open book—because these works are not defined as "an artistic work."

The exception only applies if the included work is "merely by way of background, or incidental, to the principal matters represented." It thus would appear to permit the capture of works in the background of a film, but not the direct filming of works in public places.

Finally, the exception allows the incidental capture only of specified works. The work using the exception must be "a cinematograph film or a television broadcast or transmission in a diffusion service."

A diffusion service is defined in section 1(1) as

"a telecommunication service of transmissions consisting of sounds, images, signs or signals, which takes place over wires or other paths provided by material substance and intended for reception by specific members of the public; and diffusion shall not be deemed to constitute a performance or a broadcast or as causing sounds, images, signs or signals to be seen or heard; and where sounds, images, signs or signals are displayed or emitted by any receiving apparatus to which they are conveyed by diffusion in such manner as to constitute a performance or a causing of sounds, images, signs or signals to be seen or heard in public, this shall be deemed to be effected by the operation of the receiving apparatus."

The definition of works using the exception does not include photographs. Thus, there is no freedom of panorama exception in South Africa that would permit photographs of artistic works to be taken without infringing the copyright in the works.

== Copyright policy reviews ==
=== South Africa's National Research and Development Strategy (2002) ===
A review of South Africa's research and development strategy reported on the “net cost” of copyright and royalties to South Africa as rising from R200 million to R800 million between 1990 and 2002.

=== Copyright Review Commission (2011) ===
In 2011, the Copyright Review Commission published its report on amendments to the Copyright Act needed to promote the interests of musicians. The Report recommended that the law be amended to protect the “needle time” rights of performers whose music is broadcast, that a right of communication to the public be adopted, that unfair contracts be regulated, that excessive costs and unfair practices of collective management organizations be controlled, that copyright in musical works revert to their composers after 25 years, that the "private use" exceptions be expanded and adapted for the digital era, and that the Copyright Tribunal be streamlined.

=== Draft Intellectual Property Policy 2013 ===
In 2013, the Department of Trade and Industry published a Draft Intellectual Property Policy. The Draft Policy included the following discussion of copyright policy:

"While some developing countries have benefited from the copyright regime, others have not (WIPO Studies and Commission). Many developing countries have joined international treaties in the copyright area, but can hardly show benefits that flow from such treaties. Equally, other developing countries have shown that they enforce strictly copyright regime and their resources (finance, police, border policing, restrictive internet/technological devices), but they are unable to quantify whether the costs of enforcement outweigh economic benefits that flow from the copyright-based industries. There are treaties or conventions that give nations flexibilities in copyright to allow copying, in particular for education and personal use. These flexibilities are commonly known as "fair use" or "fair dealing" in various jurisdictions. Notwithstanding the availability of these flexibilities, developing nations are of the view that these flexibilities do not cover their needs, in particular in the area of education. It is submitted that an inevitable impact of stronger protection and enforcement in terms of the TRIPS Agreement leads to reducing access to knowledge-related products in developing countries, thus poor people are exposed to damaging consequences."

Its core recommendations included:

“To enhance access to copyrighted materials and achieve developmental goals for education and knowledge transfer, South Africa must adopt pro-competitive measures under copyright legislation. The legislation must provide the maintenance and adoption of broad exemptions for educational, research and library uses.

.. .

South Africa internet users must be entitled to fair use rights such as making and distributing copies from electronic sources in reasonable numbers for educational and research purposes and using reasonable excerpts in commentary and criticism.”

The Draft Intellectual Property Policy never matured to a final policy and was replaced by the “Intellectual Property Policy of the Republic of South Africa Phase 1” that was published for comment in August 2017 and finalised in August 2018. That policy did not deal with copyright, but referred to copyright reform as an existing initiative that would be the subject of monitoring and evaluation.

==== Intellectual Property Impact Assessment (2014) ====
An assessment of the Draft Intellectual Property Policy 2013 was commissioned for the Department of Trade & Industry, conducted by Genesis Analytics. Although the report has not been publicly released by either the Department of Trade & Industry or Genesis Analytics, two versions of the report are in circulation, one completed on 31 July 2014 and the other on 6 August 2014. Both were presented to the committee of the Western Cape Parliament that conducted hearings on the Copyright Amendment Bill, 2017, in March 2023. The version of the report dated 31 July 2014 advocated for the incorporation of a general "fair use" provision, allowances for the utilisation of whole works for teaching without limitations to the types and forms of that utilisation, extending the copyright exceptions to all types of education, and removing restrictions on the number of copies for educational purposes that can be made of a work. The later version of the report, completed on 6 August 2014, recommended improved exceptions for teaching, allowing parallel importation, and new statutory licences for reproduction and translation following the Appendix of the Berne Convention, but listed the introduction of "fair use" as a case that was ‘vague, poorly articulated or poorly evidenced’ and required further attention.
