= Bantu Investment Corporation Act, 1959 =

Parliament of South Africa
- Long title: Act to constitute a Corporation the object of which is to promote and encourage industrial and other undertakings and to act as a development, financial and investment institution among Bantu persons in the Bantu areas, and to provide for other incidental matters.
- Citation: Act No. 34 of 1959
- Enacted by: Parliament of South Africa
- Royal assent: 15 May 1959
- Commenced: 3 June 1959
- Repealed: 24 April 1968
- Administered by: Minister of Bantu Administration and Development

Repealed by
- Promotion of the Economic Development of Bantu Homelands Act, 1968
- Status: Repealed

The Bantu Investment Corporation Act, Act No 34 of 1959, formed part of the apartheid system of racial segregation in South Africa. In combination with the Bantu Homelands Development Act of 1965, it allowed the South African government to capitalize on entrepreneurs operating in the Bantustans. It created a Development Corporation in each of the Bantustans.
