= Apartheid =

South African system of racial segregation

Apartheid (/ə.ˈpɑːrt.(h)aɪt/ ə-PART-(h)yte, especially South African English: /ə.ˈpɑːrt.(h)eɪt/ ə-PART-(h)ayt, Afrikaans: [aˈpart(ɦ)əit]; transl. "separateness", lit. 'aparthood') was a system of institutionalised racial segregation that existed in South Africa from 1948 to 1994. (Note: The Population Registration Act, 1950, the basis for most apartheid legislation, was abolished in 1991, although the country's first non-racial government was not established until non-racial elections held under a universal franchise in 1994.) It also existed in South West Africa (Note: South West Africa existed as a colonial territory under the control of the South African administration.) (now Namibia). It was characterized by an authoritarian political culture based on baasskap (lit. "boss-ship" or "boss-hood"), which ensured that South Africa was dominated politically, socially, and economically by the nation's minority white population. Under this minoritarian system, white citizens held the highest status, while other groups were classified as Indian/Asian, Coloured and Black African, with differing rights and privileges.

Broadly speaking, apartheid was delineated into "petty apartheid", which entailed the segregation of public facilities and social events, and "grand apartheid", which strictly segregated housing and employment opportunities by race. Public facilities were often just divided into those for Whites and those for "Non-Whites". The first apartheid law was the Prohibition of Mixed Marriages Act, 1949, followed closely by the Immorality Amendment Act of 1950, which made it illegal for most South African citizens to marry or pursue sexual relationships across racial lines. The Population Registration Act, 1950 classified all South Africans into racial groups based on appearance, known ancestry, socioeconomic status, and cultural lifestyle: "Black", "White", "Coloured", and "Indian".

Places of residence were determined by racial classification. Between 1960 and 1983, 3.5 million Black Africans were removed from their homes and forced into segregated neighbourhoods as a result of apartheid legislation, in some of the largest mass evictions in modern history. Most of these targeted removals were intended to restrict the black population to ten designated "tribal homelands", also known as bantustans.

Apartheid sparked significant international and domestic opposition, resulting in some of the most influential global social movements of the 20th century. It was the target of frequent condemnation in the United Nations and brought about extensive international sanctions, including arms embargoes and economic sanctions on South Africa. Internal resistance to apartheid became increasingly militant during the 1970s and 1980s, prompting brutal crackdowns by the National Party-led government and protracted sectarian violence that left thousands dead or in detention. Some reforms of the apartheid system were undertaken, including allowing for Indian and Coloured political representation in parliament, but these measures failed to appease most activist groups.

Between 1987 and 1993, the National Party entered into bilateral negotiations with the African National Congress (ANC), the leading anti-apartheid political movement, for ending segregation and introducing majority rule, leading to non-racial elections in April 1994.

Since the end of apartheid, elections have been open and competitive, and the lives of South Africans have improved across multiple metrics. The economic legacy and social effects of apartheid continue to persist to the present day, particularly inequality.

== Precursors ==
Apartheid is an Afrikaans word meaning "separateness", or "the state of being apart", literally "apart-ness" or apart-hood" (from the Afrikaans suffix -heid). Its first recorded use was in 1929.

Racial discrimination against Black people in South Africa dates to the beginning of large-scale European colonisation of South Africa with the Dutch East India Company's establishment of a trading post in the Cape of Good Hope in 1652, which eventually expanded into the Dutch Cape Colony. The company began the Khoikhoi–Dutch Wars in which it displaced the local Khoikhoi people, replaced them with farms worked by White settlers, and imported Black slaves from across the Dutch Empire. In the days of slavery, slaves required passes to travel away from their owners.

In 1797, the Landdrost and Heemraden, local officials, of Swellendam and Graaff-Reinet extended pass laws beyond slaves and decreed that all Khoikhoi (designated as Hottentots) moving about the country for any purpose should carry passes. This was confirmed by the British Colonial government in 1809 by the Hottentot Proclamation, which decreed that if a Khoikhoi were to move they would need a pass from their owner or a local official. Ordinance No. 49 of 1828 decreed that prospective Black immigrants were to be granted passes for the sole purpose of seeking work. These passes were to be issued for Coloureds and Khoikhoi but not for other Africans, who were nonetheless forced to carry passes.

The United Kingdom's Slavery Abolition Act 1833 provided for the gradual abolition of slavery in most parts of the British Empire, and the slave trade was made illegal throughout the British Empire by 1837. The act overrode the 1806 Cape Articles of Capitulation, which guaranteed the respect of previous legislation enacted under Roman-Dutch law and led to a separation of the law in South Africa from English Common Law. To comply with the act, the South African legislation was expanded to include Ordinance 1 in 1835, which effectively changed the status of slaves to indentured labourers. This was followed by Ordinance 3 in 1848, which introduced an indenture system for Xhosa that was little different from slavery.

The various South African colonies passed legislation throughout the rest of the 19th century to limit the freedom of unskilled workers, to increase the restrictions on indentured workers and to regulate the relations between the races. The discoveries of diamonds and gold in South Africa also raised racial inequality between White people and Black people. Some scholars have argued that Apartheid's ideology can be reflected in Afrikaner Calvinism, with its parallel traditions of racialism; for example, as early as 1933; the executive council of the Broederbond formulated a recommendation for mass segregation.

In the Cape Colony, which previously had a liberal and multi-racial constitution and a system of Cape Qualified Franchise open to men of all races, the Franchise and Ballot Act of 1892 raised the property franchise qualification and added an educational element, disenfranchising a disproportionate number of the Cape's non-White voters, and the Glen Grey Act of 1894 instigated by the government of Prime Minister Cecil Rhodes limited the amount of land Africans could hold. Similarly, in Natal, the Natal Legislative Assembly Bill of 1894 deprived Indians of the right to vote. In 1896 the South African Republic brought in two pass laws requiring Africans to carry a badge. Only those employed by a master were permitted to remain on the Rand, and those entering a "labour district" needed a special pass. During the Second Boer War, the British Empire cited racial exploitation of Blacks as a cause for its war against the Boer republics. However, the peace negotiations for the Treaty of Vereeniging demanded "the just predominance of the white race" in South Africa as a precondition for the Boer republics unifying with the British Empire.

In 1905 the General Pass Regulations Act denied Black people the vote and limited them to fixed areas, and in 1906 the Asiatic Registration Act of the Transvaal Colony required all Indians to register and carry passes. Beginning in 1906 the South African Native Affairs Commission under Godfrey Lagden began implementing a more openly segregationist policy towards non-Whites. The latter was repealed by the British government but re-enacted in 1908. In 1910, the Union of South Africa was created as a self-governing dominion, which continued the legislative program: the South Africa Act (1910) enfranchised White people, giving them complete political control over all other racial groups while removing the right of Black people to sit in parliament; the Native Land Act (1913) prevented Black people, except those in the Cape, from buying land outside "reserves"; the Natives in Urban Areas Bill (1918) was designed to force Black people into "locations"; the Urban Areas Act (1923) introduced residential segregation and provided cheap labour for industry led by White people; the Colour Bar Act (1926) prevented Black mine workers from practising skilled trades; the Native Administration Act (1927) made the British Crown rather than paramount chiefs the supreme head over all African affairs; the Native Land and Trust Act (1936) complemented the 1913 Native Land Act and, in the same year, the Representation of Natives Act removed previous Black voters from the Cape voters' roll and allowed them to elect three Whites to Parliament.

The United Party government of Jan Smuts began to move away from the rigid enforcement of segregationist laws during World War II, but faced growing opposition from Afrikaner nationalists who wanted stricter segregation. Post-war, one of the first pieces of segregating legislation enacted by Smuts' government was the Asiatic Land Tenure Bill (1946), which banned land sales to Indians and Indian descendant South Africans. The same year, the government established the Fagan Commission. Amid fears that integration would eventually lead to racial assimilation, the opposition Herenigde Nasionale Party (HNP) established the Sauer Commission to investigate the effects of the United Party's policies. The commission concluded that integration would bring about a "loss of personality" for all racial groups. The HNP incorporated the commission's findings into its campaign platform for the 1948 South African general election, which it won.

== Institution and development ==
Apartheid developed from the racism of colonial factions and due to South Africa's "unique industrialisation". The policies of industrialisation led to the segregation and classing of people, which was "specifically developed to nurture early industry such as mining". Cheap labour was the basis of the economy and this was taken from what the state classed as peasant groups and the migrants. To a large extent, the political ideology of apartheid had emerged from the colonisation of Africa by European powers which institutionalised racial discrimination and exercised a paternal philosophy of "civilising inferior natives".

Although South Africa experienced growth during Apartheid, the benefits were heavily in favor of white people. During the 1950 and 1960s wealth was concentrated in the hands of multiple white people, while the Black community incomes were very low, and living situations were dire. Black communities were also confined to impoverished rural areas making them unable to have access to a lot of resources.

=== 1948 election ===
South Africa had allowed social custom and law to govern the consideration of multiracial affairs and of the allocation, in racial terms, of access to economic, social, and political status. By 1948, black political organisations and leaders such as Alfred Xuma, James Mpanza, the African National Congress, and the Council of Non-European Trade Unions began demanding political rights, land reform, and the right to unionise.

Whites reacted negatively to the changes, allowing the Herenigde Nasionale Party (HNP) to convince a large segment of the voting bloc that the impotence of the United Party in curtailing the evolving position of non-whites indicated that the organisation had fallen under the influence of Western liberals. Smuts, as a strong advocate of the United Nations, lost domestic support when South Africa was criticised for its colour bar and the continued mandate of South West Africa by other UN member states.

The HNP proclaimed that they offered the voters a new policy to ensure continued white domination. This policy was initially expounded from a theory drafted by Hendrik Verwoerd and was presented to the HNP by the Sauer Commission. The commission's goal was to completely remove blacks from areas designated for whites, including cities, with the exception of temporary migrant labour. Blacks would then be encouraged to create their own political units in land reserved for them. The party gave this policy a name – apartheid.

The United Party's traditional bases of support not only took mutually exclusive positions, but found themselves increasingly at odds with each other. Smuts' reluctance to consider South African foreign policy against the mounting tensions of the Cold War also stirred up discontent, while the nationalists promised to purge the state and public service of communist sympathisers. The party always identified with the affluent and capitalists, and failed to appeal to its working class constituents.

The HNP won eight constituencies in the mining and industrial centres of the Witwatersrand and five more in Pretoria. Barring the predominantly English-speaking landowner electorate of the Natal, the United Party was defeated in almost every rural district. Its urban losses in the nation's most populous province, the Transvaal, proved equally devastating. As the voting system was disproportionately weighted in favour of rural constituencies and the Transvaal in particular, the 1948 election saw the HNP the lead in parliament with an eight-vote lead. Daniel François Malan became the first nationalist prime minister, with the aim of implementing the apartheid philosophy and silencing liberal opposition.

Within the HNP there were factional differences in the party about the implementation of systemic racial segregation. The "baasskap" (white domination or supremacist) faction, which was the dominant faction in the HNP and state institutions, favoured systematic segregation, but also favoured the participation of black Africans in the economy, with black labour controlled to advance the economic gains of Afrikaners. A second faction were the "purists", who believed in "vertical segregation", in which blacks and whites would be entirely separated, with blacks living in native reserves, with separate political and economic structures, which, they believed, would entail severe short-term pain, but would also lead to independence of white South Africa from black labour in the long term. A third faction, which included Hendrik Verwoerd, sympathised with the purists, but allowed for the use of black labour, while implementing the purist goal of vertical separation. Verwoerd would refer to this as a policy of "good neighbourliness" as a means of justifying such segregation.

=== Legislation ===
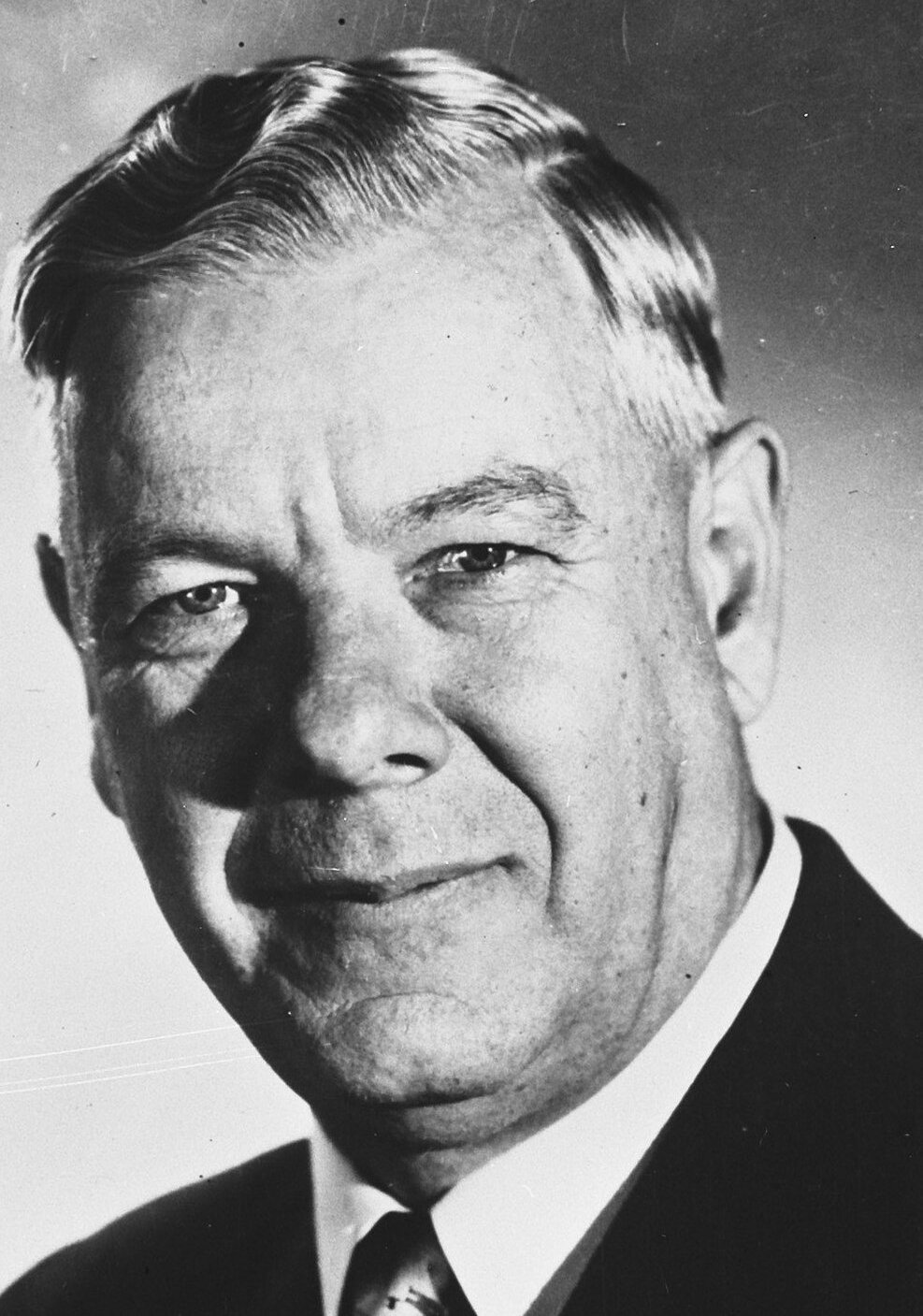
Hendrik Verwoerd, minister of native affairs (1950–1958) and prime minister (1958–1966), earned the nickname 'Architect of Apartheid' from his large role in creating legislation.

HNP leaders argued that South Africa did not comprise a single nation, but was made up of four distinct racial groups: white, black, Coloured and Indian. Such groups were split into 13 nations or racial federations. White people encompassed the English and Afrikaans language groups; the black populace was divided into ten such groups.

The state passed laws that paved the way for "grand apartheid", which was centred on separating races on a large scale, by compelling people to live in separate places defined by race. This strategy was in part adopted from "left-over" British rule that separated different racial groups after they took control of the Boer republics in the Anglo-Boer war. This created the black-only "townships" or "locations", where blacks were relocated to their own towns. As the HNP government's minister of native affairs from 1950, Hendrik Verwoerd had a significant role in crafting such laws, which led to him being regarded as the 'Architect of Apartheid'.

The first two grand apartheid laws were the Population Registration Act, 1950, and the Group Areas Act, 1950, which divided urban areas into "group areas" in which ownership and residence was restricted to certain population groups. Under the Population Registration Act, racial classification was formalised and required every person over 18 to carry an identity card detailing their racial classification. Official teams or boards were established to come to a conclusion on those people whose race was unclear. This caused difficulty, especially for Coloured people, separating families when members were assigned to different races.

Until then, most settlements had people of different races living side by side. This Act put an end to diverse areas and determined where one lived according to race. Each race was allotted its own area, which was used in later years as a basis of forced removal. The Prevention of Illegal Squatting Act of 1951 allowed the government to demolish black shanty town slums and forced white employers to pay for the construction of housing for those black workers who were permitted to reside in cities otherwise reserved for whites. The Native Laws Amendment Act, 1952 centralised and tightened pass laws so that blacks could not stay in urban areas for longer than 72 hours without a permit.

The Prohibition of Mixed Marriages Act of 1949 prohibited marriage between persons of different races, and the Immorality Act of 1950 made sexual relations between whites and other races a criminal offence.

Under the Reservation of Separate Amenities Act of 1953, municipal grounds could be reserved for a particular race, creating, among other things, separate beaches, buses, hospitals, schools and universities. Signboards such as "whites only" applied to public areas, even including park benches. Black South Africans were provided with services greatly inferior to those of whites, and, to a lesser extent, to those of Indian and Coloured people.

Further laws had the aim of suppressing resistance, especially armed resistance, to apartheid. The Suppression of Communism Act of 1950 banned the Communist Party of South Africa and any party subscribing to Communism. The act defined Communism and its aims so sweepingly that anyone who opposed government policy risked being labelled as a Communist. Since the law specifically stated that Communism aimed to disrupt racial harmony, it was frequently used to gag opposition to apartheid. Disorderly gatherings were banned, as were certain organisations that were deemed threatening to the government. It also empowered the Ministry of Justice to impose banning orders.

After the Defiance Campaign, the government used the act for the mass arrests and banning of leaders of dissident groups such as the African National Congress (ANC), the South African Indian Congress (SAIC), and the South African Congress of Trade Unions (SACTU). After the release of the Freedom Charter, 156 leaders of these groups were charged in the 1956 Treason Trial. It established censorship of film, literature, and the media under the Customs and Excise Act 1955 and the Official Secrets Act 1956. The same year, the Native Administration Act 1956 allowed the government to banish blacks.

The Bantu Authorities Act of 1951 created separate government structures for blacks and whites and was the first piece of legislation to support the government's plan of separate development in the bantustans. The Bantu Education Act, 1953 established a separate education system for blacks emphasizing African culture and vocational training under the Ministry of Native Affairs and defunded most mission schools. The Promotion of Black Self-Government Act of 1959 entrenched the HNP policy of nominally independent "homelands" for blacks. So-called "self–governing Bantu units" were proposed, which would have devolved administrative powers, with the promise later of autonomy and self-government. It also abolished the seats of white representatives of black South Africans and removed from the rolls the few blacks still qualified to vote. The Bantu Investment Corporation Act of 1959 set up a mechanism to transfer capital to the homelands to create employment there. Legislation of 1967 allowed the government to stop industrial development in "white" cities and redirect such development to the "homelands". The Black Homeland Citizenship Act of 1970 marked a new phase in the Bantustan strategy. It changed the status of blacks to citizens of one of the ten autonomous territories. The aim was to ensure a demographic majority of white people within South Africa by having all ten Bantustans achieve full independence.

Inter-racial contact in sport was frowned upon, but there were no segregatory sports laws.

The government tightened pass laws compelling blacks to carry identity documents, to prevent the immigration of blacks from other countries. To reside in a city, blacks had to be in employment there. Until 1956 women were for the most part excluded from these pass requirements, as attempts to introduce pass laws for women were met with fierce resistance.

=== Disenfranchisement of Coloured voters ===
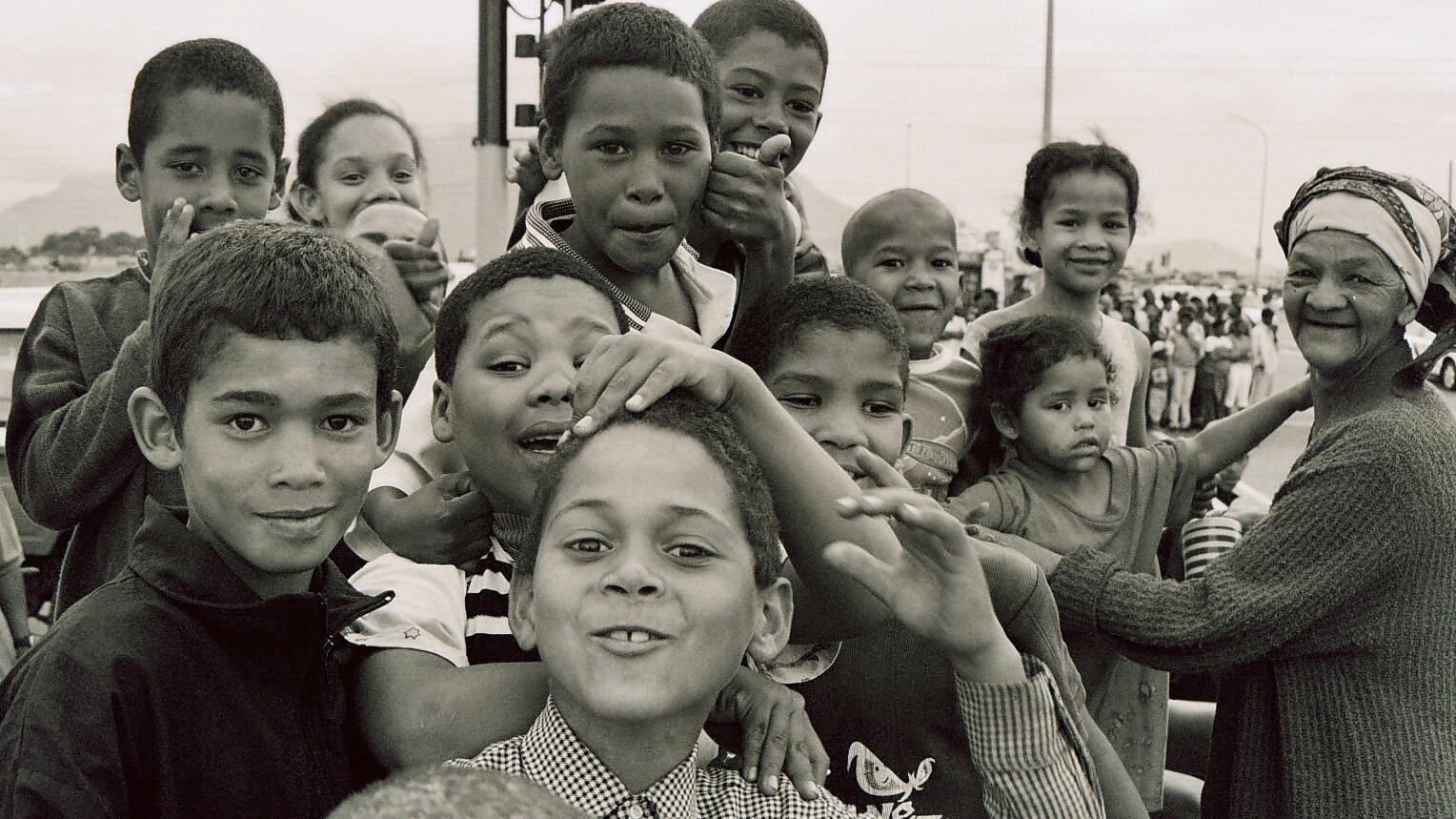
Cape Coloured children in Bonteheuwel

Annual per capita personal income by race group in South Africa relative to white levels

In 1950, D. F. Malan announced the NP's intention to create a Coloured Affairs Department. J.G. Strijdom, Malan's successor as prime minister, moved to strip voting rights from black and Coloured residents of the Cape Province. The previous government had introduced the Separate Representation of Voters Bill into Parliament in 1951, turning it into an Act on 18 June 1951; however, four voters, G Harris, W D Franklin, W D Collins and Edgar Deane, challenged its validity in court with support from the United Party. The Cape Supreme Court upheld the act, but was reversed by the Appeal Court, finding the act invalid because a two-thirds majority in a joint sitting of both Houses of Parliament was needed to change the entrenched clauses of the Constitution. The government then introduced the High Court of Parliament Bill (1952), which gave Parliament the power to overrule decisions of the court. The Cape Supreme Court and the Appeal Court declared this invalid too.

In 1955 the Strijdom government increased the number of judges in the Appeal Court from five to 11, and appointed pro-Nationalist judges to fill the new places. In the same year they introduced the Senate Act, which increased the Senate from 49 seats to 89. Adjustments were made such that the NP controlled 77 of these seats. The parliament met in a joint sitting and passed the Separate Representation of Voters Act in 1956, which transferred Coloured voters from the common voters' roll in the Cape to a new Coloured voters' roll. Immediately after the vote, the Senate was restored to its original size. The Senate Act was contested in the Supreme Court, but the recently enlarged Appeal Court, packed with government-supporting judges, upheld the act, and also the Act to remove Coloured voters.

The 1956 law allowed Coloureds to elect four people to Parliament, but a 1969 law abolished those seats and stripped Coloureds of their right to vote. Since Indians had never been allowed to vote, this resulted in whites being the sole enfranchised group.

Separate representatives for coloured voters were first elected in the general election of 1958. Even this limited representation did not last, being ended from 1970 by the Separate Representation of Voters Amendment Act, 1968. Instead, all coloured adults were given the right to vote for the Coloured Persons Representative Council, which had limited legislative powers. The council was in turn dissolved in 1980. In 1984 a new constitution introduced the Tricameral Parliament in which coloured voters elected the House of Representatives.

A 2016 study in The Journal of Politics suggests that disenfranchisement in South Africa had a significant negative effect on basic service delivery to the disenfranchised.

=== Division among whites ===
Before South Africa became a republic in 1961, politics among white South Africans was typified by the division between the mainly Afrikaner pro-republic conservative and the largely English anti-republican liberal sentiments, with the legacy of the Boer War still a factor for some people. Once South Africa became a republic, Prime Minister Hendrik Verwoerd called for improved relations and greater accord between people of British descent and the Afrikaners. He claimed that the only difference was between those in favour of apartheid and those against it. The ethnic division would no longer be between Afrikaans and English speakers, but between blacks and whites.

Most Afrikaners supported the notion of unanimity of white people to ensure their safety. White voters of British descent were divided. Many had opposed a republic, leading to a majority "no" vote in Natal. Later, some of them recognised the perceived need for white unity, convinced by the growing trend of decolonisation elsewhere in Africa, which concerned them. British Prime Minister Harold Macmillan's "Wind of Change" speech left the British faction feeling that the United Kingdom had abandoned them. The more conservative English speakers supported Verwoerd; others were troubled by the severing of ties with the UK and remained loyal to the Crown. They were displeased by having to choose between British and South African nationalities. Although Verwoerd tried to bond these different blocs, the subsequent voting illustrated only a minor swell of support, indicating that a great many English speakers remained apathetic and that Verwoerd had not succeeded in uniting the white population.

== Homeland system ==
Map of the 20 bantustans in South Africa and South West Africa

Under the homeland system, the government attempted to divide South Africa and South West Africa into a number of separate states, each of which was supposed to develop into a separate nation-state for a different ethnic group.

Territorial separation was hardly a new institution. There were, for example, the "reserves" created under the British government in the nineteenth century. Under apartheid, 13 percent of the land was reserved for black homelands, a small amount relative to its total population, and generally in economically unproductive areas of the country. The Tomlinson Commission of 1954 justified apartheid and the homeland system, but stated that additional land ought to be given to the homelands, a recommendation that was not carried out.

When Verwoerd became prime minister in 1958, the policy of "separate development" came into being, with the homeland structure as one of its cornerstones. Verwoerd came to believe in the granting of independence to these homelands. The government justified its plans on the ostensible basis that the "government's policy is, therefore, not a policy of discrimination on the grounds of race or colour, but a policy of differentiation on the ground of nationhood, of different nations, granting to each self-determination within the borders of their homelands – hence this policy of separate development". Under the homelands system, blacks would no longer be citizens of South Africa, becoming citizens of the independent homelands who worked in South Africa as foreign migrant labourers on temporary work permits. In 1958 the Promotion of Black Self-Government Act was passed, and border industries and the Bantu Investment Corporation were established to promote economic development and the provision of employment in or near the homelands.

The vision of a South Africa divided into multiple ethnostates appealed to the reform-minded Afrikaner intelligentsia, and it provided a more coherent philosophical and moral framework for the National Party's policies, while also providing a veneer of intellectual respectability to the controversial policy of so-called baasskap.

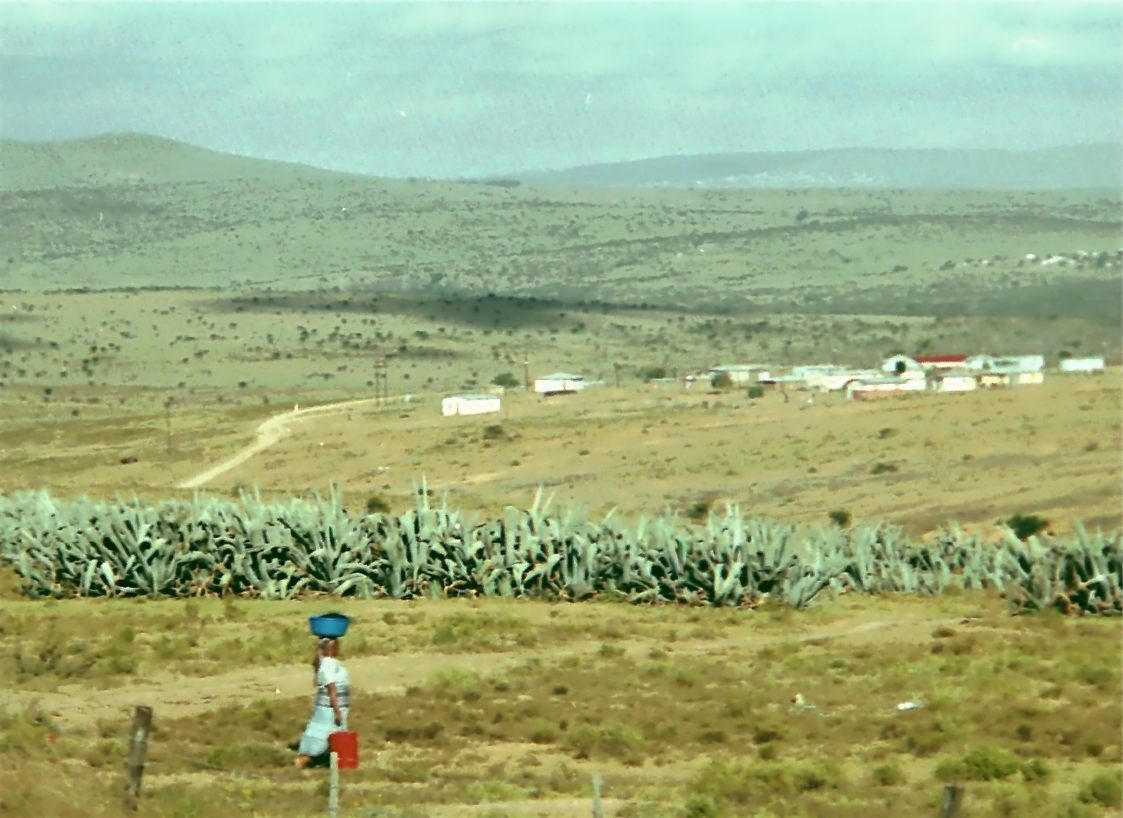
Rural area in Ciskei, one of the four nominally independent homelands

In total, 20 homelands were allocated to ethnic groups, ten in South Africa proper and ten in South West Africa. Of these 20 homelands, 19 were classified as black, while one, Basterland, was set aside for a sub-group of Coloureds known as Basters, who are closely related to Afrikaners. Four of the homelands were declared independent by the South African government: Transkei in 1976, Bophuthatswana in 1977, Venda in 1979, and Ciskei in 1981 (known as the TBVC states). Once a homeland was granted its nominal independence, its designated citizens had their South African citizenship revoked and replaced with citizenship in their homeland. These people were then issued passports instead of passbooks. Citizens of the nominally autonomous homelands also had their South African citizenship circumscribed, meaning they were no longer legally considered South African. The South African government attempted to draw an equivalence between their view of black citizens of the homelands and the problems which other countries faced through entry of illegal immigrants.

Each black homeland controlled its own education, health and police systems.

=== International recognition of the Bantustans ===
Bantustans within the borders of South Africa and South West Africa were classified by degree of nominal self-rule: 6 were "non-self-governing", 10 were "self-governing", and 4 were "independent". In theory, self-governing Bantustans had control over many aspects of their internal functioning but were not yet sovereign nations. Independent Bantustans (Transkei, Bophutatswana, Venda and Ciskei; also known as the TBVC states) were intended to be fully sovereign. In reality, they had no significant economic infrastructure and with few exceptions encompassed swaths of disconnected territory. This meant all the Bantustans were little more than puppet states controlled by South Africa.

Throughout the existence of the independent Bantustans, South Africa remained the only country to recognise their independence. Nevertheless, internal organisations of many countries, as well as the South African government, lobbied for their recognition. For example, upon the foundation of Transkei, the Swiss-South African Association encouraged the Swiss government to recognise the new state. In 1976, leading up to a United States House of Representatives resolution urging the President to not recognise Transkei, the South African government intensely lobbied lawmakers to oppose the bill. Each TBVC state extended recognition to the other independent Bantustans while South Africa showed its commitment to the notion of TBVC sovereignty by building embassies in the TBVC capitals.

=== Forced removals ===
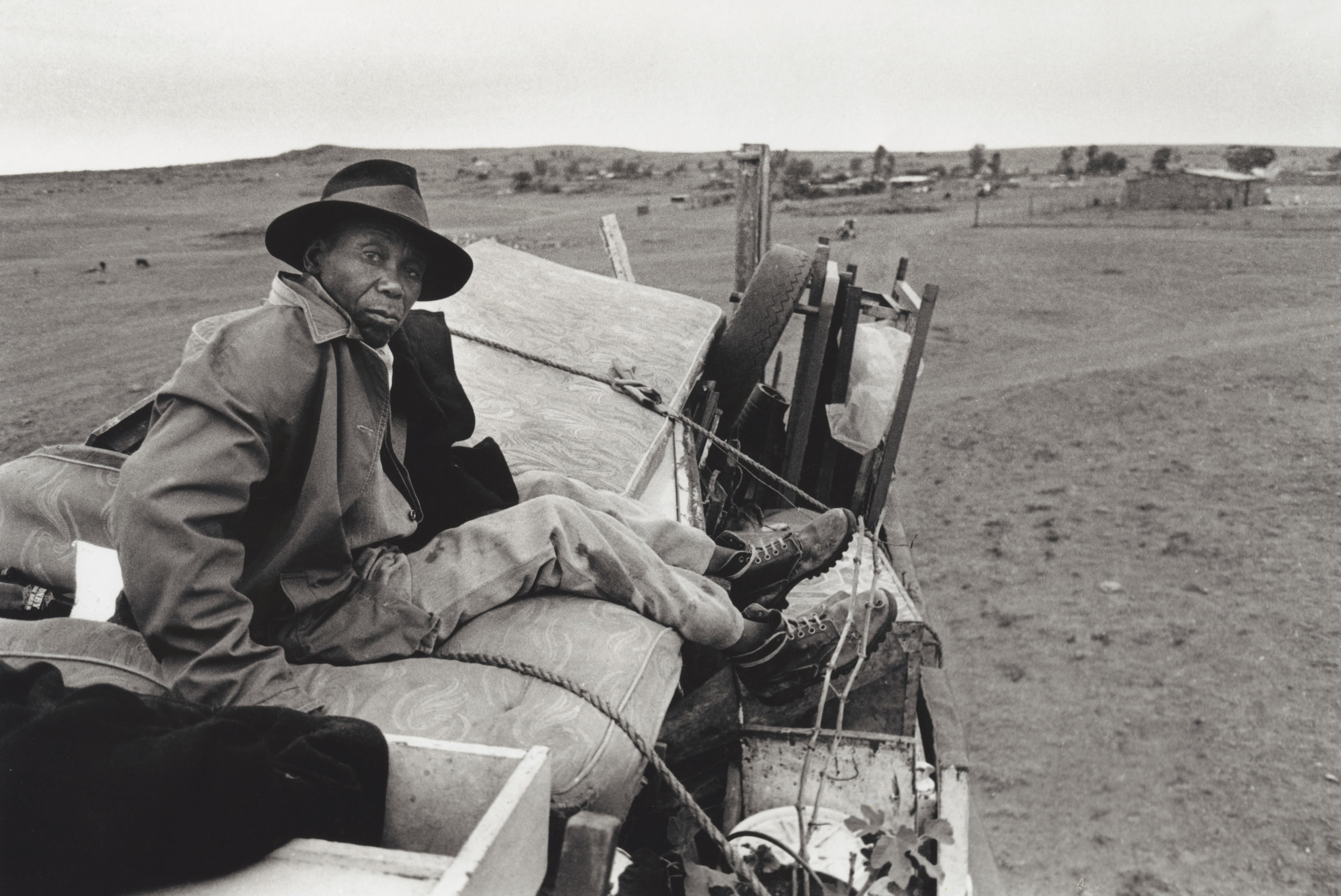
Man subject to forced removal in Mogopa, Western Transvaal, February 1984

During the 1950s to the 1980s, the government implemented a policy of "resettlement", to force people to move to their designated "group areas". Millions of people were forced to relocate. These removals included people relocated due to slum clearance programmes, labour tenants on white-owned farms, the inhabitants of the so-called "black spots" (black-owned land surrounded by white farms), the families of workers living in townships close to the homelands, and "surplus people" from urban areas. The best-publicised forced removals of the 1950s occurred in Johannesburg, when 60,000 people were moved to the new township of Soweto.

The forced removals were not limited to black South Africans. Nearly 600,000 Coloured, Indian and Chinese people were moved under the Group Areas Act. Some 40,000 whites were also forced to move when land was transferred from "white South Africa" into the black homelands. Its implementation led to the destruction of vibrant, multiracial neighborhoods, leaving a lasting legacy on the social and economic inequality in South Africa.

Forced removals were carried out under the Group Areas Act of 1950.

== Society during apartheid ==
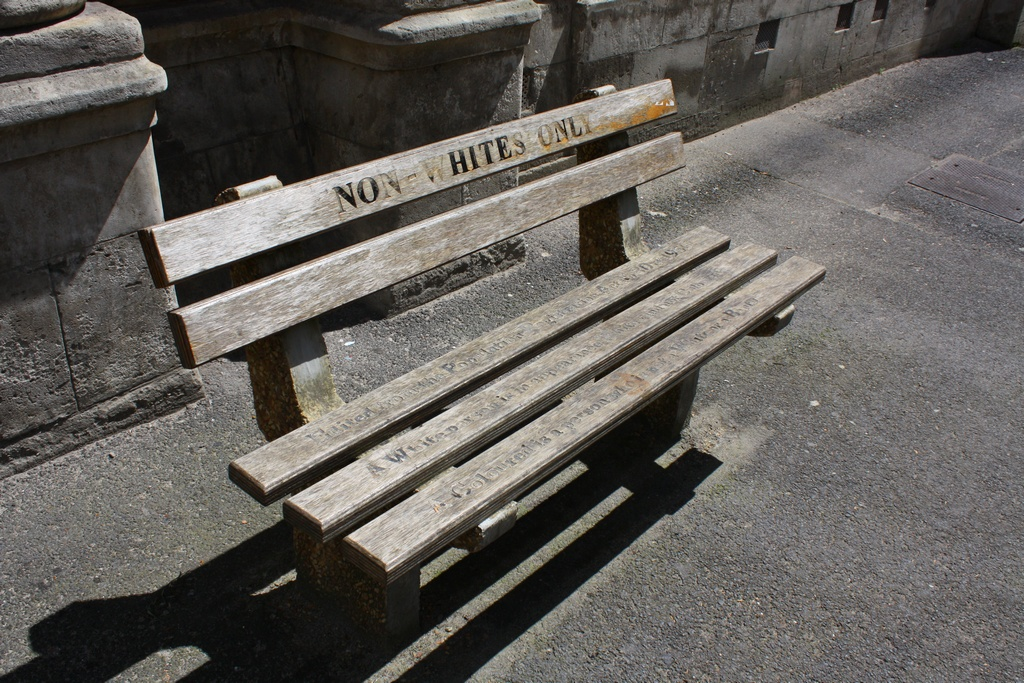
"Non-whites" bench outside Cape Town High Court

The NP passed a string of legislation that became known as "petty apartheid". The first of these was the Prohibition of Mixed Marriages Act 55 of 1949, prohibiting marriage between whites and people of other races. The Immorality Amendment Act 21 of 1950 (as amended in 1957 by Act 23) forbade "unlawful racial intercourse" and "any immoral or indecent act" between a white and a black, Indian or Coloured person.

The Reservation of Separate Amenities Act, 1953 enforced petty apartheid in public places, enforcing racial segregation of public premises, vehicles, and services. These were mostly enforced by signs designating beaches, toilets, benches, etc. as for Whites or "Non-Whites".

Black people were not allowed to run businesses or professional practices in areas designated as "white South Africa" unless they had a permit – such being granted only exceptionally. Without a permit, they were required to move to the black "homelands" and set up businesses and practices there.

Trains, hospitals and ambulances were segregated. Because of the smaller numbers of white patients and the fact that white doctors preferred to work in white hospitals, conditions in white hospitals were much better than those in often overcrowded and understaffed, significantly underfunded black hospitals.

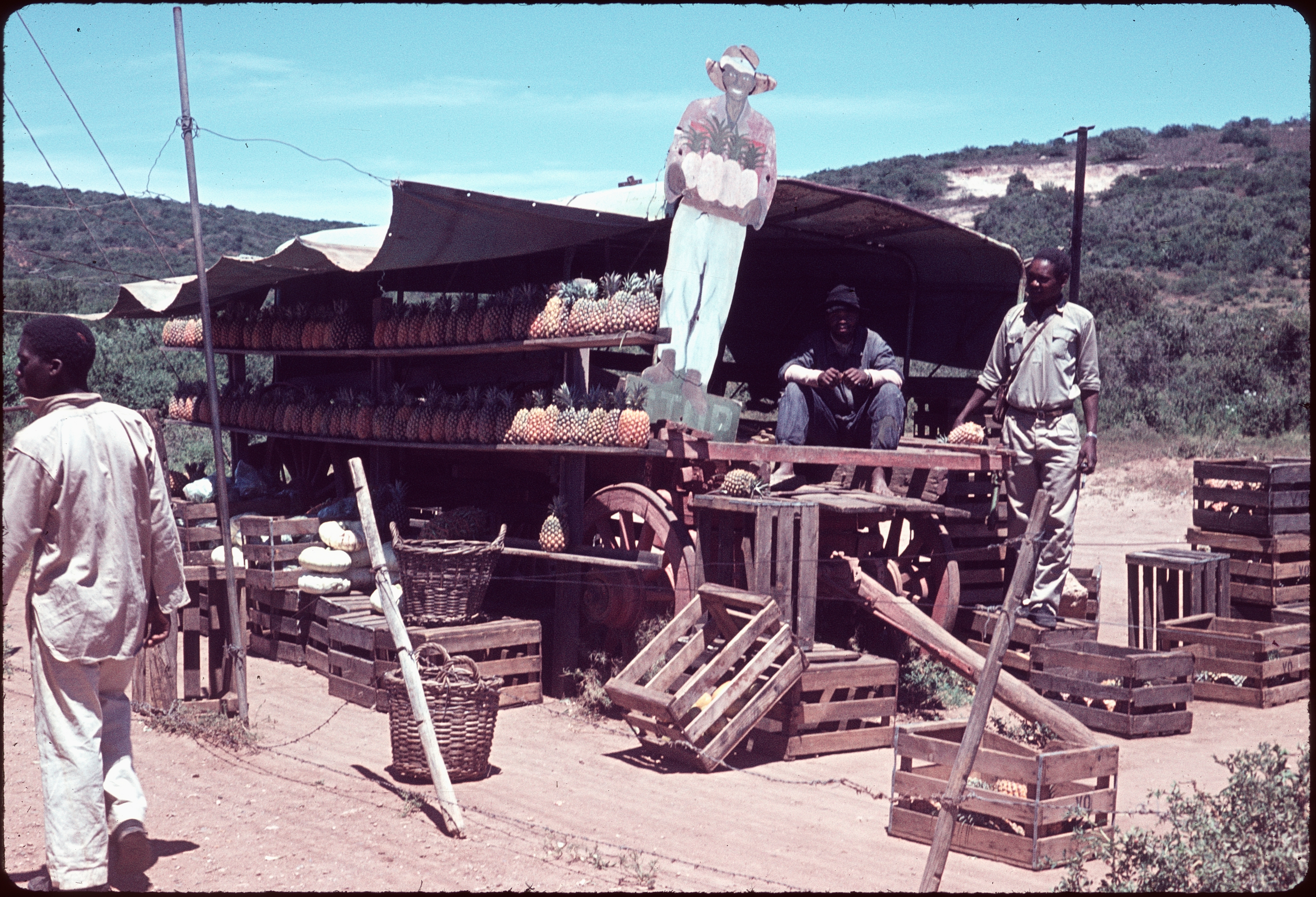
Workers at a pineapple stall between Port Elizabeth and Grahamstown, December 1962

Residential areas were segregated and blacks were allowed to live in white areas only if employed as a servant and even then only in servants' quarters. Black people were excluded from working in white areas, unless they had a pass, nicknamed the dompas, also spelt dompass or dom pass (Note: The most likely origin of this name is from the Afrikaans "verdomde pas" (meaning accursed pass).). Only black people with "Section 10" rights (those who had migrated to the cities before World War II) were excluded from this provision. A pass was issued only to a black person with approved work. Spouses and children had to be left behind in black homelands. A pass was issued for one magisterial district (usually one town) confining the holder to that area only. Being without a valid pass made a person subject to arrest and trial for being an illegal migrant. This was often followed by deportation to the person's homeland and prosecution of the employer for employing an illegal migrant. Police vans patrolled white areas to round up blacks without passes. Black people were not allowed to employ whites in white South Africa.

This legally enforced segregation was reinforced through deliberate town planning measures, such as introducing natural, industrial and infrastructural buffer zones. The legacy of this town planning element still hinders economic integration of urban economies in the twenty-first century, physically separating semi-formal township economies from industrial and corporate clusters in cities.

Although trade unions for black and Coloured workers had existed since the early 20th century, it was not until the 1980s reforms that a mass black trade union movement developed. Trade unions under apartheid were racially segregated, with 54 unions being white only, 38 for Indian and Coloured and 19 for black people. The Industrial Conciliation Act (1956) legislated against the creation of multi-racial trade unions and attempted to split existing multi-racial unions into separate branches or organisations along racial lines.

Blacks were not allowed to buy hard liquor. They were able to buy only state-produced poor quality beer (although this law was relaxed later). Public beaches, swimming pools, some pedestrian bridges, drive-in cinema parking spaces, graveyards, parks, and public toilets were segregated. Cinemas and theatres in white areas were not allowed to admit blacks. There were practically no cinemas in black areas. Most restaurants and hotels in white areas were not allowed to admit blacks except as staff. Blacks were prohibited from attending white churches under the Churches Native Laws Amendment Act of 1957, but this was never rigidly enforced, and churches were one of the few places where races could mix without the interference of the law. Blacks earning 360 rand a year or more had to pay taxes while the white threshold was more than twice as high, at 750 rand a year. On the other hand, the taxation rate for whites was considerably higher than that for blacks.

Blacks could not acquire land in white areas. In the homelands, much of the land belonged to a "tribe", where the local chieftain would decide how the land had to be used. This resulted in whites owning almost all the industrial and agricultural lands and much of the prized residential land. Most blacks were stripped of their South African citizenship when the "homelands" became "independent", and they were no longer able to apply for South African passports. Eligibility requirements for a passport had been difficult for blacks to meet, the government contending that a passport was a privilege, not a right, and the government did not grant many passports to blacks. Apartheid pervaded culture as well as the law, and was entrenched by most of the mainstream media.

=== Coloured classification ===
The population was classified into four groups: African, White, Indian, and Coloured (capitalised to denote their legal definitions in South African law). The Coloured group included people regarded as being of mixed descent, including of Bantu, Khoisan, European and Malay ancestry. Many were descended from slaves, or indentured workers, who had been brought to South Africa from India, Sri Lanka, Madagascar, and China.

The Population Registration Act, (Act 30 of 1950), defined South Africans as belonging to one of three races: White, Black or Coloured. Appearance, social acceptance and descent were used to determine the qualification of an individual into one of the three categories. A white person was described by the act as one whose parents were both white and possessed the "habits, speech, education, deportment and demeanour" of a white person. Blacks were defined by the act as belonging to an African race or tribe. Lastly, Coloureds were those who could not be classified as black or white, including those of Indian ancestry.

The apartheid bureaucracy devised complex (and often arbitrary) criteria at the time that the Population Registration Act was implemented to determine who was Coloured. Minor officials would administer tests to determine if someone should be categorised either Coloured or White, or if another person should be categorised either Coloured or Black. The tests included the pencil test, in which a pencil was shoved into the subjects' curly hair and the subjects made to shake their head. If the pencil stuck they were deemed to be Black; if dislodged they were pronounced Coloured. Other tests involved examining the shapes of jaw lines and buttocks and pinching people to see what language they would say "Ouch" in. As a result of these tests, different members of the same family found themselves in different race groups. Further tests determined membership of the various sub-racial groups of the Coloureds.

Discriminated against by apartheid, Coloureds were as a matter of state policy forced to live in separate townships, as defined in the Group Areas Act (1950), in some cases leaving homes their families had occupied for generations, and received an inferior education, though better than that provided to Africans. They played an important role in the anti-apartheid movement: for example the African Political Organization established in 1902 had an exclusively Coloured membership.

Voting rights were denied to Coloureds in the same way that they were denied to Blacks from 1950 to 1983. However, in 1977 the NP caucus approved proposals to bring Coloureds and Indians into central government. In 1982, final constitutional proposals produced a referendum among Whites, and the Tricameral Parliament was approved. The Constitution was reformed the following year to allow the Coloured and Indian minorities participation in separate Houses in a Tricameral Parliament, and Botha became the first Executive State President. The idea was that the Coloured minority could be granted voting rights, but the Black majority were to become citizens of independent homelands. These separate arrangements continued until the abolition of apartheid. The Tricameral reforms led to the formation of the (anti-apartheid) United Democratic Front as a vehicle to try to prevent the co-option of Coloureds and Indians into an alliance with Whites. The battles between the UDF and the NP government from 1983 to 1989 were to become the most intense period of struggle between left-wing and right-wing South Africans.

=== Education ===
Education was segregated by the 1953 Bantu Education Act, which crafted a separate system of education for black South African students and was designed to prepare black people for lives as a labouring class. In the 1970s, the state spent ten times more per child on the education of white children than on black children within the Bantu Education system (the education system in black schools within white South Africa). The public schools that replaced the mission schools were funded via taxpayer, where Blacks were largely the ones being taxed the most to fund the schools. When it came to teachers only 10 percent of the black teachers had even graduated high school, and the student to teacher ratio was 58 to 1.

In 1959 separate universities were created for black, Coloured and Indian people. Existing universities were not permitted to enroll new black students. The Afrikaans Medium Decree of 1974 required the use of Afrikaans and English on an equal basis in high schools outside the homelands.

Before formal Apartheid, in 1948, 10 universities existed in South Africa: four were Afrikaans, four were English, one for Blacks and a Correspondence University open to all ethnic groups. By 1981, under apartheid government, 11 new universities were built: seven for Blacks, one for Coloureds, one for Indians, one for Afrikaans and one dual-language medium Afrikaans and English.

=== Women under apartheid ===
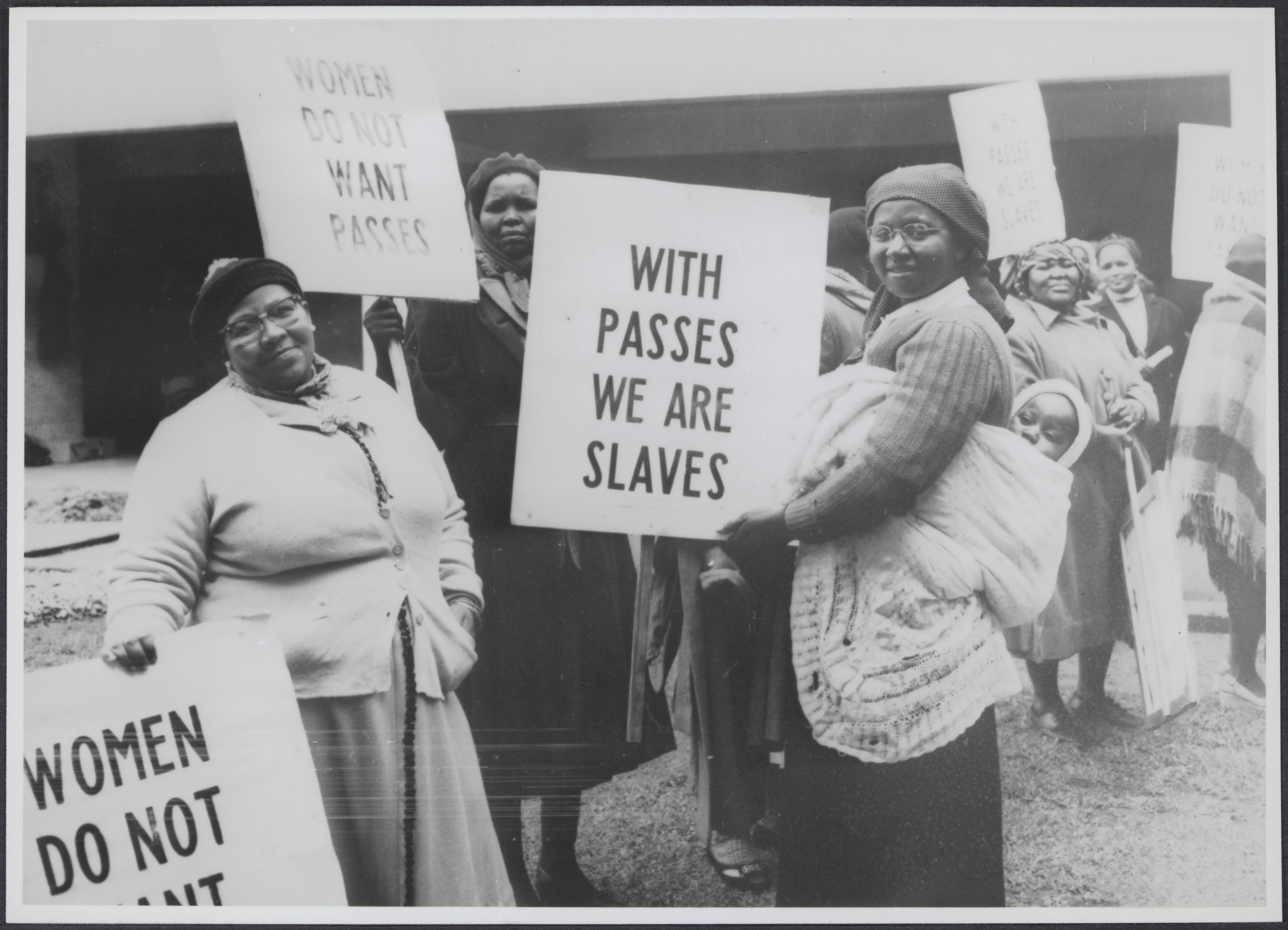
Black women demonstrate against pass laws, 1956.

Apartheid had a major effect on Black and Coloured women, who suffered due to both racial and gender discrimination while being politically pushed to the margins. Jobs were often hard to find. Many Black and Coloured women worked as agricultural employees or as domestic workers, but wages were extremely low, if existent at all.

In terms of mothers and their families, many South African children developed diseases caused by malnutrition and sanitation problems given the oppressive public policies, and mortality rates were therefore high. The controlled movement of black and Coloured workers within the country caused by the Natives Urban Areas Act of 1923 and restrictive 'pass laws' separated family members from one another. This occurred because the apartheid system perceived that men could prove their employment in urban centres while most women were merely dependents; consequently, they risked being deported to rural areas. Even in rural areas, there were legal hurdles for women to own land, and jobs outside cities were even more scarce.

=== Sport under apartheid ===
By the 1930s, association football was divided into numerous institutions based on race: the (White) South African Football Association, the South African Indian Football Association (SAIFA), the South African African Football Association (SAAFA) and its rival the South African Bantu Football Association, and the South African Coloured Football Association (SACFA). Lack of funds to provide proper equipment would be noticeable in regards to black amateur football matches, reflecting economic inequality in society at large. Apartheid's social engineering made it more difficult to compete across racial lines. Thus, in an effort to centralise finances, the federations merged in 1951, creating the South African Soccer Federation (SASF), which brought Black, Indian, and Coloured national associations into one body that opposed apartheid. This was generally opposed more and more by the growing apartheid government, and – with urban segregation being reinforced with ongoing racist policies – it was harder to play football along these racial lines. In 1956, the Pretoria regime – the administrative capital of South Africa – passed the first apartheid sports policy; by doing so, it emphasised the White-led government's opposition to inter-racialism.

While football was plagued by racism, it also played a role in protesting apartheid and its policies. With the international bans from FIFA and other major sporting events, South Africa would be in the spotlight internationally. In a 1977 survey, white South Africans ranked the lack of international sport as one of the three most damaging consequences of apartheid. By the mid-1950s, Black South Africans would also use media to challenge the "racialisation" of sports in South Africa; anti-apartheid forces had begun to pinpoint sport as the "weakness" of white national morale. Black journalists for the Johannesburg Drum magazine were the first to give the issue public exposure, with an intrepid special issue in 1955 that asked, "Why shouldn't our blacks be allowed in the SA team?" As time progressed, South Africa's international standing would continue to be strained. In the 1980s, as the oppressive system was slowly collapsing and the ANC and National Party started negotiations on the end of apartheid, football associations also discussed the formation of a single, non-racial controlling body. This unity process accelerated in the late 1980s and led to the creation, in December 1991, of an incorporated South African Football Association. On 3 July 1992, FIFA finally welcomed South Africa back into international football.

Sport has long been an important part of life in South Africa, and the boycotting of games by international teams had a profound effect on the white population, perhaps more than the trade embargoes did. After the re-acceptance of South Africa's sports teams by the international community, sport played a major unifying role between the country's diverse ethnic groups. Mandela's support of the predominantly white rugby fraternity during the 1995 Rugby World Cup was considered instrumental in bringing together South African sports fans of all races.

Activities in the sport of professional boxing were also affected, as there were 44 recorded professional boxing fights for national titles deemed "for Whites only" between 1955 and 1979, and 397 fights as deemed "for non-Whites" between 1901 and 1978.

=== Asians during apartheid ===
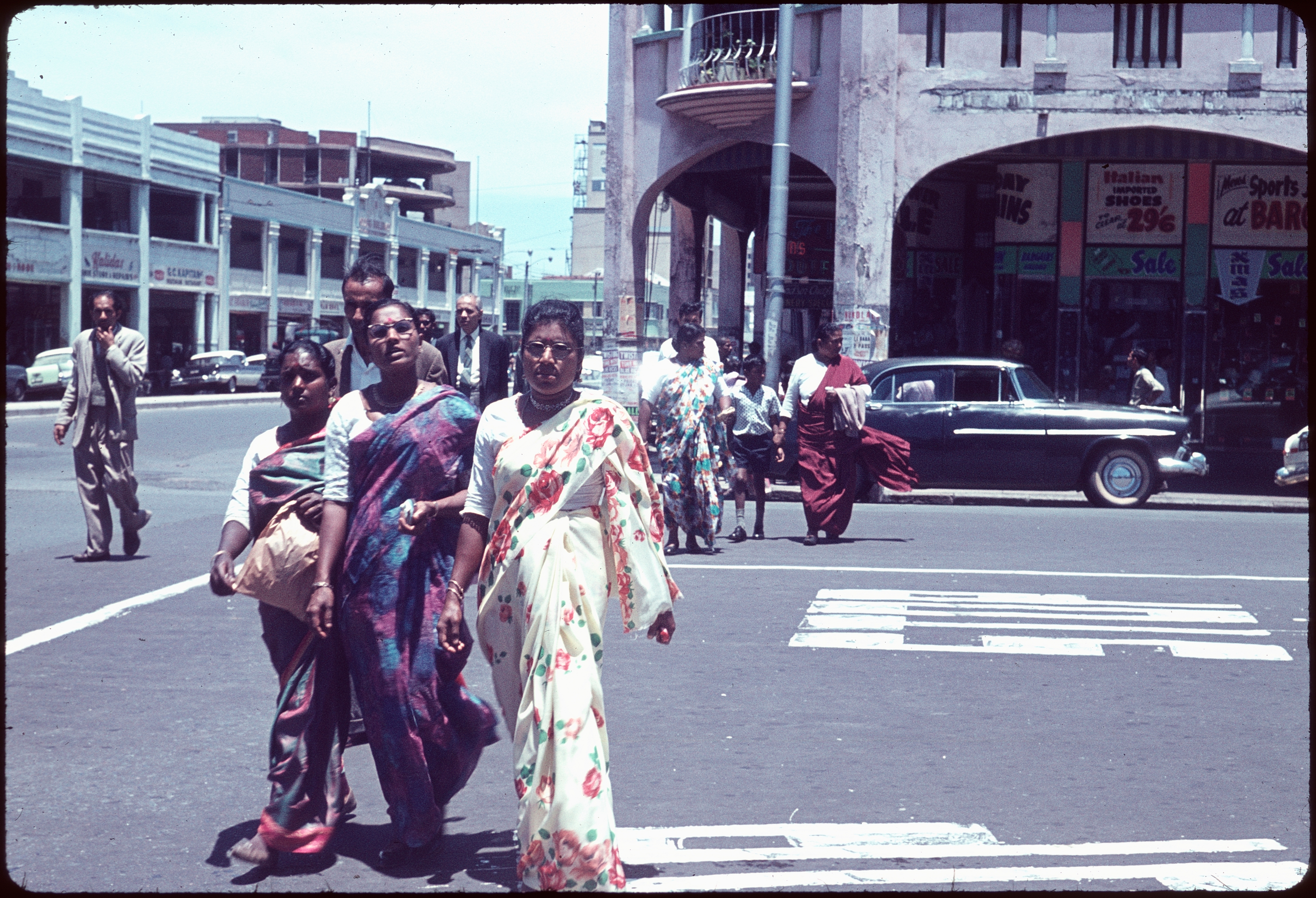
Indian South Africans in Durban, 1963

Defining its Asian population, a minority that did not appear to belong to any of the initial three designated non-white groups, was a constant dilemma for the apartheid government.

The classification of "honorary white" (a term which would be ambiguously used throughout apartheid) was granted to immigrants from Japan, South Korea and Taiwan – countries with which South Africa maintained diplomatic and economic relations – and their descendants.

Indian South Africans during apartheid were assigned to many ranges of categories from "Asian" to "black" to "Coloured" to "Indian", but never as white. The group faced severe discrimination during the apartheid regime and were subject to numerous racialist policies.

Chinese South Africans were initially either classified as "Coloured" or "Other Asian" and were subject to numerous forms of discrimination and restriction. It was not until 1984 that South African Chinese, then numbering about 10,000, were given the same official rights as the Japanese, to be treated as whites in terms of the Group Areas Act, although they still faced discrimination and did not receive all the benefits of their newly obtained honorary white status, such as voting.

Indonesians arrived at the Cape of Good Hope as slaves until the abolishment of slavery during the 19th century. They were predominantly Muslim, were allowed religious freedom and formed their own ethnic community known as Cape Malays. They were classified as part of the Coloured racial group. This was the same for South Africans of Malaysian descent. South Africans of Filipino descent were classified as "black" due to the historical outlook on Filipinos by White South Africans, and many of them lived in Bantustans.

The Lebanese population were somewhat of an anomaly during the apartheid era. Lebanese immigration to South Africa was chiefly Christian, and the group was originally classified as non-white; however, a court case in 1913 ruled that because Lebanese and Syrians originated from the Canaan region (the birthplace of Christianity and Judaism), they could not be discriminated against by race laws which targeted non-believers, and thus, were classified as white. The Lebanese community maintained their white status after the Population Registration Act came into effect; however, further immigration from the Middle East was restricted.

== Internal resistance ==
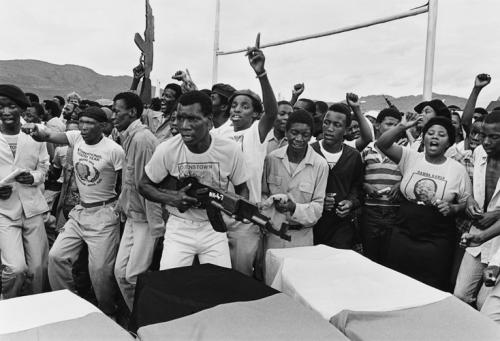
Demonstrators at the funeral for victims of the 1985 Queenstown Massacre

Apartheid sparked significant internal resistance. The government responded to a series of popular uprisings and protests with police brutality, which in turn increased local support for the armed resistance struggle. Internal resistance to the apartheid system in South Africa came from several sectors of society and saw the creation of organisations dedicated variously to peaceful protests, passive resistance and armed insurrection.

In 1949, the youth wing of the African National Congress (ANC) took control of the organisation and started advocating a radical African nationalist programme. The new young leaders proposed that white authority could only be overthrown through mass campaigns. In 1950 that philosophy saw the launch of the Programme of Action, a series of strikes, boycotts and civil disobedience actions that led to occasional violent clashes with the authorities.

In 1959, a group of disenchanted ANC members formed the Pan Africanist Congress of Azania (PAC), which organised a demonstration against pass books on 21 March 1960. One of those protests was held in the township of Sharpeville, where 69 people were killed by police in the Sharpeville massacre.

In the wake of Sharpeville, the government declared a state of emergency. More than 18,000 people were arrested, including leaders of the ANC and PAC, and both organisations were banned. The resistance went underground, with some leaders in exile abroad and others engaged in campaigns of domestic sabotage and terrorism.

In May 1961, before the declaration of South Africa as a Republic, an assembly representing the banned ANC called for negotiations between the members of the different ethnic groupings, threatening demonstrations and strikes during the inauguration of the Republic if their calls were ignored.

When the government overlooked them, the strikers (among the main organisers was a 42-year-old, Thembu-origin Nelson Mandela) carried out their threats. The government countered swiftly by giving police the authority to arrest people for up to twelve days and detaining many strike leaders amid numerous cases of police brutality. Defeated, the protesters called off their strike. The ANC then chose to launch an armed struggle through a newly formed military wing, Umkhonto we Sizwe (MK), which would perform acts of sabotage on tactical state structures. Its first sabotage plans were carried out on 16 December 1961, the anniversary of the Battle of Blood River.

In the 1970s, the Black Consciousness Movement (BCM) was created by tertiary students influenced by the Black Power movement in the US. BCM endorsed black pride and African customs and did much to alter the feelings of inadequacy instilled among black people by the apartheid system. The leader of the movement, Steve Biko, was taken into custody on 18 August 1977 and was beaten to death in detention.

In 1976, secondary students in Soweto took to the streets in the Soweto uprising to protest against the imposition of Afrikaans as the only language of instruction. On 16 June, police opened fire on students protesting peacefully. According to official reports 23 people were killed, but the number of people who died is usually given as 176, with estimates of up to 700. In the following years several student organisations were formed to protest against apartheid, and these organisations were central to urban school boycotts in 1980 and 1983 and rural boycotts in 1985 and 1986.

List of attacks attributed to MK and compiled by the Committee for South African War Resistance (COSAWR) between 1980 and 1983

In parallel with student protests, labour unions started protest action in 1973 and 1974. After 1976 unions and workers are considered to have played an important role in the struggle against apartheid, filling the gap left by the banning of political parties. In 1979 black trade unions were legalised and could engage in collective bargaining, although strikes were still illegal. Economist Thomas Sowell wrote that basic supply and demand led to violations of Apartheid "on a massive scale" throughout the nation, simply because there were not enough white South African business owners to meet the demand for various goods and services. Large portions of the garment industry and construction of new homes, for example, were effectively owned and operated by blacks, who either worked surreptitiously or who circumvented the law with a white person as a nominal, figurehead manager.

In 1983, anti-apartheid leaders determined to resist the tricameral parliament assembled to form the United Democratic Front (UDF) in order to coordinate anti-apartheid activism inside South Africa. The first presidents of the UDF were Archie Gumede, Oscar Mpetha and Albertina Sisulu; patrons were Archbishop Desmond Tutu, Dr Allan Boesak, Helen Joseph, and Nelson Mandela. Basing its platform on abolishing apartheid and creating a nonracial democratic South Africa, the UDF provided a legal way for domestic human rights groups and individuals of all races to organise demonstrations and campaign against apartheid inside the country. Churches and church groups also emerged as pivotal points of resistance. Church leaders were not immune to prosecution, and certain faith-based organisations were banned, but the clergy generally had more freedom to criticise the government than militant groups did. The UDF, coupled with the protection of the church, accordingly permitted a major role for Archbishop Desmond Tutu, who served both as a prominent domestic voice and international spokesperson denouncing apartheid and urging the creation of a shared nonracial state.

Although the majority of whites supported apartheid, some 20 percent did not. Parliamentary opposition was galvanised by Helen Suzman, Colin Eglin and Harry Schwarz, who formed the Progressive Federal Party. Extra-parliamentary resistance was largely centred in the South African Communist Party and women's organisation the Black Sash. Women were also notable in their involvement in trade union organisations and banned political parties. Public intellectuals like the author Nadine Gordimer also played a role in the anti-apartheid movement.

== International relations during apartheid ==
=== Commonwealth ===
South Africa's policies were subject to international scrutiny in 1960, when British Prime Minister Harold Macmillan criticised them during his Wind of Change speech in Cape Town. Weeks later, tensions came to a head in the Sharpeville massacre, resulting in more international condemnation. Soon afterwards, Prime Minister Hendrik Verwoerd announced a referendum on whether the country should become a republic; 52% voted "Yes".

As a consequence of this change of status, South Africa needed to reapply for continued membership of the Commonwealth, with which it had privileged trade links. It became clear that African and South and Southeast Asian member states would oppose South Africa due to its apartheid policies. As a result, South Africa withdrew from the Commonwealth when the Republic was created, on 31 May 1961.

During the 1980s, the Commonwealth advocated for economic sanctions to accelerate the dismantling of apartheid, and in 1986 during a mini-summit which involved seven different countries, including the United Kingdom, a tough programme of sanctions was agreed.

=== Organisation for African Unity ===
The Organisation of African Unity (OAU) censured apartheid and demanded sanctions against South Africa. In 1969, 14 nations from Central and East Africa gathered in Lusaka, Zambia, and formulated the Lusaka Manifesto, which was signed on 13 April by all of the countries in attendance except Malawi. This manifesto was later taken on by both the OAU and the United Nations.

The Lusaka Manifesto summarised the political situations of self-governing African countries, condemning racism and inequity, and calling for Black majority rule in all African nations. Regarding South Africa, the manifesto said that the countries supported peaceful change "if it were possible", and made clear that they would support guerrilla liberation movements if necessary.

South Africa's negative response to the Lusaka Manifesto and rejection of a change to its policies brought about another OAU announcement in October 1971. The Mogadishu Declaration stated that South Africa's rebuffing of negotiations meant that its Black people could only be freed through military means, and that no African state should converse with the apartheid government.

=== Outward-looking policy ===
In 1966, B. J. Vorster became prime minister. He was not prepared to dismantle apartheid, but he did try to redress South Africa's isolation and revitalise the country's global reputation. This he called his "Outward-Looking" policy.

Vorster's was willing to talk to African leaders, unlike Verwoerd. In 1966, he met the heads of the neighbouring states of Lesotho, Swaziland and Botswana. In 1967, he offered technological and financial aid to any African state prepared to receive it, asserting that no political strings were attached, aware that many African states needed financial aid despite their opposition to South Africa's racial policies. Many were also tied to South Africa economically because of their migrant labour population working down the South African mines. Botswana, Lesotho and Swaziland remained outspoken critics of apartheid, but were dependent on South African economic assistance.

Malawi was the first non-neighbouring country to accept South African aid. In 1967, the two states set out their political and economic relations. In 1969, Malawi was the only country at the assembly which did not sign the Lusaka Manifesto condemning South Africa's apartheid policy. In 1970, Malawian president Hastings Banda made his first official stopover in South Africa.

Associations with Mozambique followed suit and were sustained after that country won its sovereignty in 1975. Angola was also granted South African loans. Other countries which formed relationships with South Africa included Liberia, Ivory Coast, Madagascar, Mauritius, Gabon, Zaire (now DR Congo) and the Central African Republic. Although these states condemned apartheid (more than ever after South Africa's denunciation of the Lusaka Manifesto), South Africa's economic and military dominance meant that they remained dependent on South Africa to varying degrees.

=== Sports and culture ===
==== Beginning ====
South Africa's isolation in sport began in the mid-1950s and increased throughout the 1960s. Apartheid forbade multiracial sport, which meant that overseas teams, by virtue of them having players of different races, could not play in South Africa. In 1956, the International Table Tennis Federation severed its ties with the all-White South African Table Tennis Union, preferring the non-racial South African Table Tennis Board. The apartheid government responded by confiscating the passports of the Board's players so that they were unable to attend international games.

==== Verwoerd years ====
In 1959, the non-racial South African Sports Association (SASA) was formed to secure the rights of all players on the global field. After meeting with no success in its endeavours to attain credit by collaborating with White establishments, SASA approached the International Olympic Committee (IOC) in 1962, calling for South Africa's expulsion from the Olympic Games. The IOC sent South Africa a caution to the effect that, if there were no changes, they would be barred from competing at the 1964 Olympic Games in Tokyo. The changes were initiated, and in January 1963, the South African Non-Racial Olympic Committee (SANROC) was set up. The Anti-Apartheid Movement persisted in its campaign for South Africa's exclusion, and the IOC acceded in barring the country from the 1964 Olympic Games. South Africa selected a multi-racial team for the next Olympic Games, and the IOC opted for incorporation in the 1968 Mexico City Olympic Games. Because of protests from AAMs and African nations, however, the IOC was forced to retract the invitation.

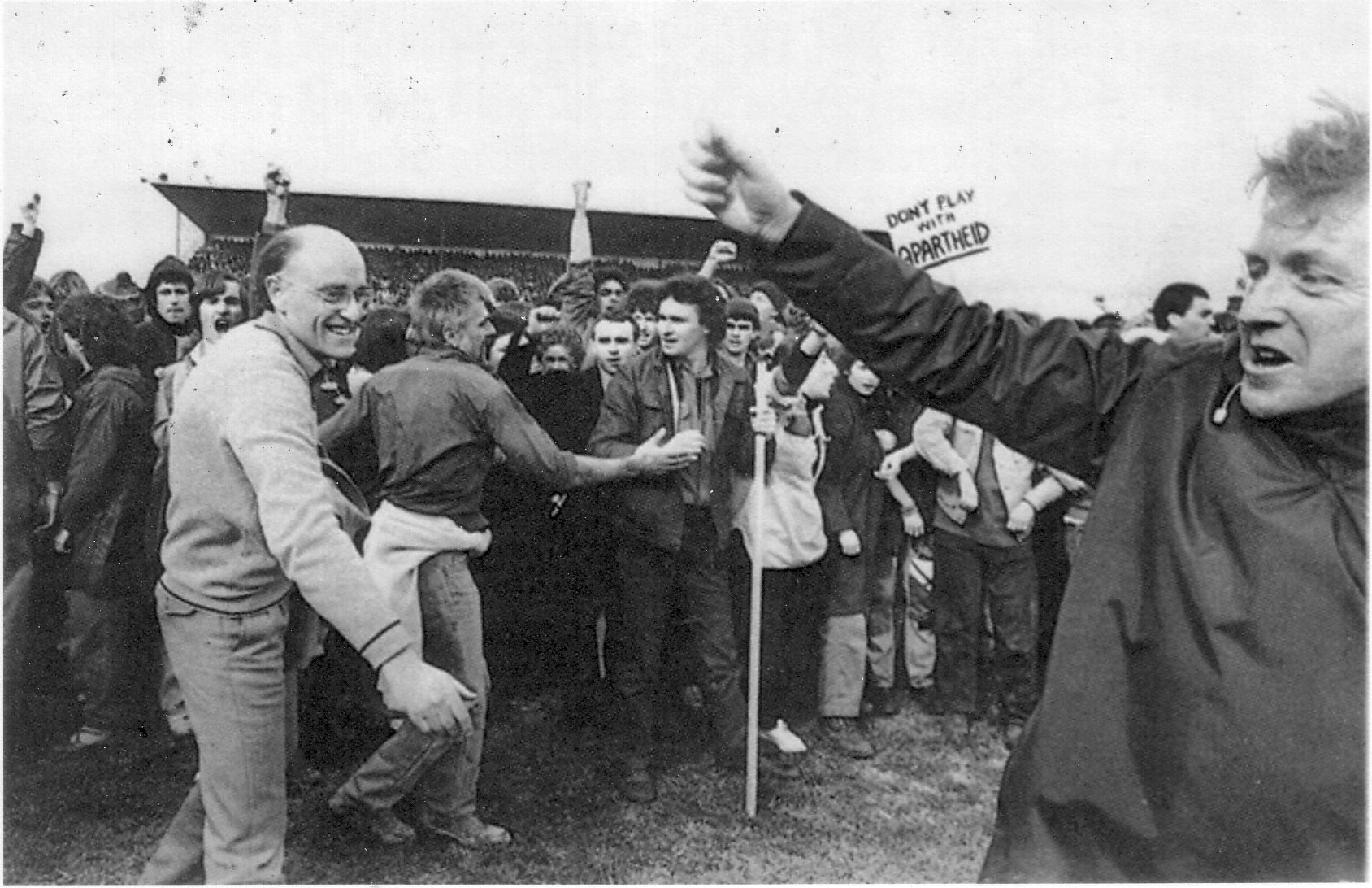
Protests against the 1981 Springbok tour of New Zealand

Foreign complaints about South Africa's bigoted sports brought more isolation. Racially selected New Zealand sports teams toured South Africa until the 1970 All Blacks rugby tour, when Maori were allowed to enter the country under the status of "honorary Whites". Huge and widespread protests occurred in New Zealand in 1981 against the Springbok tour – the government spent $8,000,000 protecting games using the army and police force. A planned All Black tour to South Africa in 1985 remobilised the New Zealand protesters and it was cancelled. A "rebel tour" – not government sanctioned – went ahead in 1986, but after that sporting ties were cut, and New Zealand made a decision not to convey an authorised rugby team to South Africa until the end of apartheid.

==== Vorster years ====
On 6 September 1966, Verwoerd was fatally stabbed at Parliament House by parliamentary messenger Dimitri Tsafendas. John Vorster took office shortly after, and announced that South Africa would no longer dictate to the international community what their teams should look like. Although this reopened the gate for international sporting meets, it did not signal the end of South Africa's racist sporting policies. In 1968, Vorster went against his policy by refusing to permit Basil D'Oliveira, a Coloured South African-born cricketer, to join the English cricket team on its tour to South Africa. Vorster said that the side had been chosen only to prove a point, and not on merit. D'Oliveira was eventually included in the team as the first substitute, but the tour was cancelled. Protests against certain tours brought about the cancellation of a number of other visits, including that of an England rugby team touring South Africa in 1969–70.

The first of the "White Bans" occurred in 1971 when the Chairman of the Australian Cricketing Association – Sir Don Bradman – flew to South Africa to meet Vorster. Vorster had expected Bradman to allow the tour of the Australian cricket team to go ahead, but things became heated after Bradman asked why Black sportsmen were not allowed to play cricket. Vorster stated that Blacks were intellectually inferior and had no finesse for the game. Bradman, thinking this ignorant and repugnant, asked Vorster if he had heard of a man named Garry Sobers. On his return to Australia, Bradman released a short statement: "We will not play them until they choose a team on a non-racist basis." (Note: In 1986, Nelson Mandela's first question to a visiting Australian statesman, Malcolm Fraser, was if Donald Bradman was still alive. On Mandela's release from prison in 1990, Fraser gave him an autographed bat inscribed with "To Nelson Mandela in recognition of a great unfinished innings—Don Bradman".)

In South Africa, Vorster vented his anger publicly against Bradman, while the African National Congress rejoiced. This was the first time a predominantly White nation had taken the side of multiracial sport, producing an unsettling resonance that more "White" boycotts were coming.

In 1971, Vorster altered his policies even further by distinguishing multiracial from multinational sport. Multiracial sport, between teams with players of different races, remained outlawed; multinational sport, however, was now acceptable: international sides would not be subject to South Africa's racial stipulations.

In 1978, Nigeria boycotted the Commonwealth Games because New Zealand's sporting contacts with the South African government were not considered to be in accordance with the 1977 Gleneagles Agreement. Nigeria also led the 32-nation boycott of the 1986 Commonwealth Games because of UK Prime Minister Margaret Thatcher's ambivalent attitude towards sporting links with South Africa, significantly affecting the quality and profitability of the Games and thus thrusting apartheid into the international spotlight.

==== Cultural boycott ====
In the 1960s, the Anti-Apartheid Movements began to campaign for cultural boycotts of apartheid South Africa. Artists were requested not to present or let their works be hosted in South Africa. In 1963, 45 British writers put their signatures to an affirmation approving of the boycott, and, in 1964, American actor Marlon Brando called for a similar affirmation for films. In 1965, the Writers' Guild of Great Britain called for a proscription on the sending of films to South Africa. Over sixty American artists signed a statement against apartheid and against professional links with the state. The presentation of some South African plays in the United Kingdom and the United States was also vetoed. After the arrival of television in South Africa in 1975, the British Actors Union, Equity, boycotted the service, and no British programme concerning its associates could be sold to South Africa. Similarly, when home video grew popular in the 1980s, the Australian arm of CBS/Fox Video (now 20th Century Fox Home Entertainment) placed stickers on their VHS and Betamax cassettes which labelled exporting such cassettes to South Africa as "an infringement of copyright". Sporting and cultural boycotts did not have the same effect as economic sanctions, but they did much to lift consciousness amongst normal South Africans of the global condemnation of apartheid.

=== Western influence ===
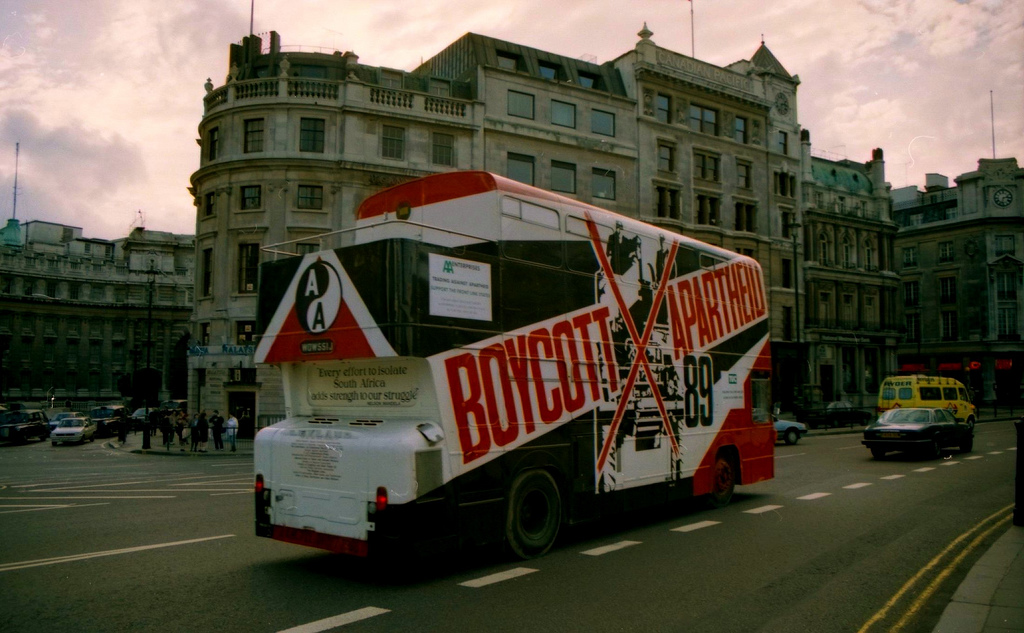
London bus in 1989 carrying the "Boycott Apartheid" message

While international opposition to apartheid grew, the Nordic countries – and Sweden in particular – provided both moral and financial support for the ANC. On 21 February 1986 Sweden's Prime Minister Olof Palme made the keynote address to the Swedish People's Parliament Against Apartheid held in Stockholm. In addressing the hundreds of anti-apartheid sympathisers as well as leaders and officials from the ANC and the Anti-Apartheid Movement such as Oliver Tambo, Palme declared: "Apartheid cannot be reformed; it has to be eliminated."

Other Western countries adopted a more ambivalent position. In Switzerland, the Swiss-South African Association lobbied on behalf of the South African government. The Nixon administration implemented a policy known as the Tar Baby Option, pursuant to which the US maintained close relations with the Apartheid South African government. The Reagan administration evaded international sanctions and provided diplomatic support in international forums for the South African government. The United States also increased trade with the Apartheid regime, while describing the ANC as "a terrorist organisation". Like the Reagan administration, the government of Margaret Thatcher pursued a policy of "constructive engagement" with the apartheid government, vetoing the imposition of UN economic sanctions. Public U.S. government justifications for supporting the Apartheid regime included a belief in "free trade" and the perception of the anti-communist South African government as a bastion against Marxist forces in Southern Africa, for example, by the military intervention of South Africa in the Angolan Civil War in support of right-wing insurgents fighting to topple the government. The U.K. government also declared the ANC a terrorist organisation.

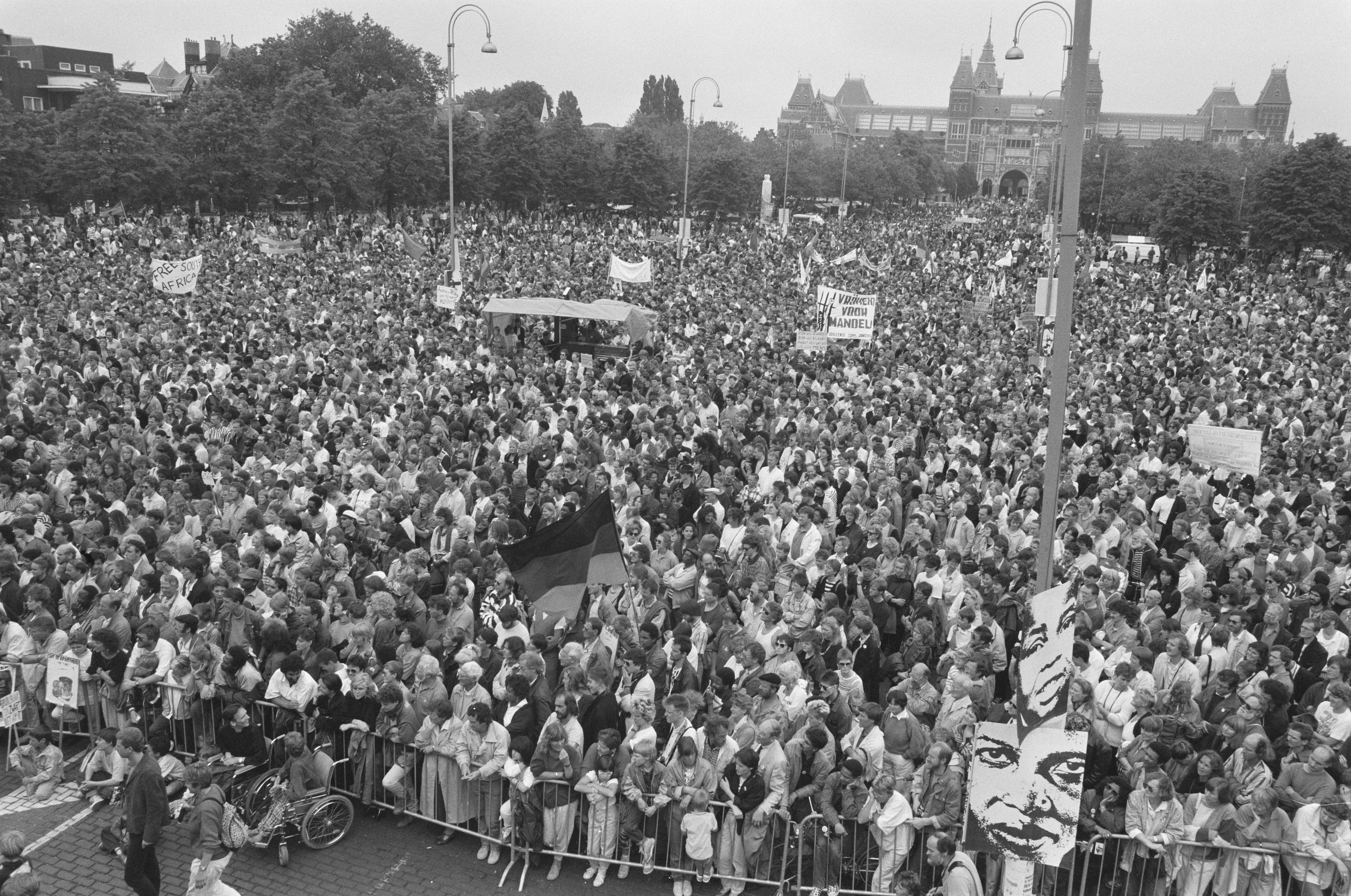
Anti-apartheid protest in Amsterdam, Netherlands, 11 June 1988

By the late-1980s, with no sign of a political resolution in South Africa, Western patience began to run out. By 1989, a bipartisan Republican/Democratic initiative in the US favoured economic sanctions (realised as the Comprehensive Anti-Apartheid Act of 1986), the release of Nelson Mandela, and a negotiated settlement involving the ANC. Thatcher too began to take a similar line, but insisted on the suspension of the ANC's armed struggle.

The UK's significant economic involvement in South Africa may have provided some leverage with the South African government, with both the UK and the US applying pressure and pushing for negotiations. However, neither the UK nor the US was willing to apply economic pressure upon their multinational interests in South Africa, such as the mining company Anglo American. Although a high-profile compensation claim against these companies was thrown out of court in 2004, the US Supreme Court in May 2008 upheld an appeals court ruling allowing another lawsuit that sought damages of more than US$400 billion from major international companies accused of aiding South Africa's apartheid system.

=== Anti-sovietism and militarization ===
Apartheid-era propaganda leaflet issued to South African military personnel in the 1980s. The pamphlet decries "Russian colonialism and oppression" in English, Afrikaans and Portuguese.

During the 1950s, South African military strategy was decisively shaped by fears of communist espionage and a conventional Soviet threat to the strategic Cape trade route between the south Atlantic and Indian Oceans. South African officials frequently accused domestic opposition groups of being communist proxies. For its part, the Soviet Union viewed South Africa as a bastion of neocolonialism and a regional Western ally, which helped fuel its support for various anti-apartheid causes.

Soviet support for militant anti-apartheid movements worked in the government's favour, as its claim to be reacting in opposition to aggressive communist expansion gained greater plausibility, and helped it justify its own domestic militarisation methods, known as "Total Strategy". Total Strategy involved building up a formidable conventional military and counter-intelligence capability. As a result of "Total Strategy", South African society became increasingly militarised.

=== Foreign military operations ===
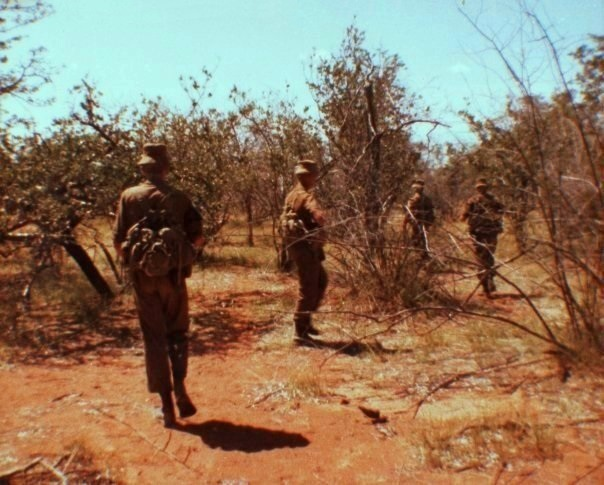
South African paratroops on a raid in Angola, 1980s

Total Strategy was advanced in the context of MK, PLAN, and Azanian People's Liberation Army (APLA) guerrilla raids into South Africa or against South African targets in South West Africa; frequent South African reprisal attacks on these movements' external bases in Angola, Zambia, Mozambique, Zimbabwe, and Botswana, often involving collateral damage to foreign infrastructure and civilian populations; and periodic complaints brought before the international community about South African violations of its neighbours' sovereignty.

The apartheid government made judicious use of extraterritorial operations to eliminate its military and political opponents, arguing that neighbouring states, including their civilian populations, which hosted, tolerated on their soil, or otherwise sheltered anti-apartheid insurgent groups could not evade responsibility for provoking retaliatory strikes. While it did focus on militarising the borders and sealing up its domestic territory against insurgent raids, it also relied heavily on an aggressive preemptive and counter-strike strategy, which fulfilled a preventive and deterrent purpose. The reprisals which occurred beyond South Africa's borders involved not only hostile states, but neutral and sympathetic governments as well, often forcing them to react against their will and interests.

External South African military operations were aimed at eliminating the training facilities, safehouses, infrastructure, equipment, and manpower of the insurgents. However, their secondary objective was to dissuade neighbouring states from offering sanctuary to MK, PLAN, APLA, and similar organisations. This was accomplished by deterring the supportive foreign population from cooperating with infiltration and thus undermining the insurgents' external sanctuary areas. It would also send a clear message to the host government that collaborating with insurgent forces involved potentially high costs.

The scale and intensity of foreign operations varied, and ranged from small special forces units carrying out raids on locations across the border which served as bases for insurgent infiltration to major conventional offensives involving armour, artillery, and aircraft. Actions such as Operation Protea in 1981 and Operation Askari in 1983 involved both full scale conventional warfare and a counter-insurgency reprisal operation. The insurgent bases were usually situated near military installations of the host government, so that SADF retaliatory strikes hit those facilities as well and attracted international attention and condemnation of what was perceived as aggression against the armed forces of another sovereign state. This would inevitably result in major engagements, in which the SADF's expeditionary units would have to contend with the firepower of the host government's forces. Intensive conventional warfare of this nature carried the risk of severe casualties among white soldiers, which had to be kept to a minimum for political reasons. There were also high economic and diplomatic costs associated with openly deploying large numbers of South African troops into another country. Furthermore, military involvement on that scale had the potential to evolve into wider conflict situations, in which South Africa became entangled. For example, South Africa's activities in Angola, initially limited to containing PLAN, later escalated to direct involvement in the Angolan Civil War.

As it became clearer that full-scale conventional operations could not effectively fulfil the requirements of a regional counter-insurgency effort, South Africa turned to a number of alternative methods. Retributive artillery bombardments were the least sophisticated means of reprisal against insurgent attacks. Between 1978 and 1979 the SADF directed artillery fire against locations in Angola and Zambia from which insurgent rockets were suspected to have been launched. This precipitated several artillery duels with the Zambian Army. Special forces raids were launched to harass PLAN and MK by killing prominent members of those movements, destroying their offices and safehouses (Note: One example was the Gaborone Raid, carried out in 1985, during which a South African special forces team crossed the border into Botswana and demolished four suspected MK safe houses, severely damaging another four.), and seizing valuable records stored at these sites. The SADF also sabotaged infrastructure being used for the insurgents' war effort; for example, port facilities in southern Angola's Moçâmedes District, where Soviet arms were frequently offloaded for PLAN, as well as the railway line which facilitated their transport to PLAN headquarters in Lubango, were common targets. Sabotage was also used as a pressure tactic when South Africa was negotiating with a host government to cease providing sanctuary to insurgent forces, as in the case of Operation Argon. Successful sabotage actions of high-profile economic targets undermined a country's ability to negotiate from a position of strength, and made it likelier to accede to South African demands rather than risk the expense of further destruction and war.

Also noteworthy were South African transnational espionage efforts, which included covert assassinations, kidnappings, and attempts to disrupt the overseas influence of anti-apartheid organisations. South African military intelligence agents were known to have abducted and killed anti-apartheid activists and others suspected of having ties to MK in London and Brussels.

== State security ==
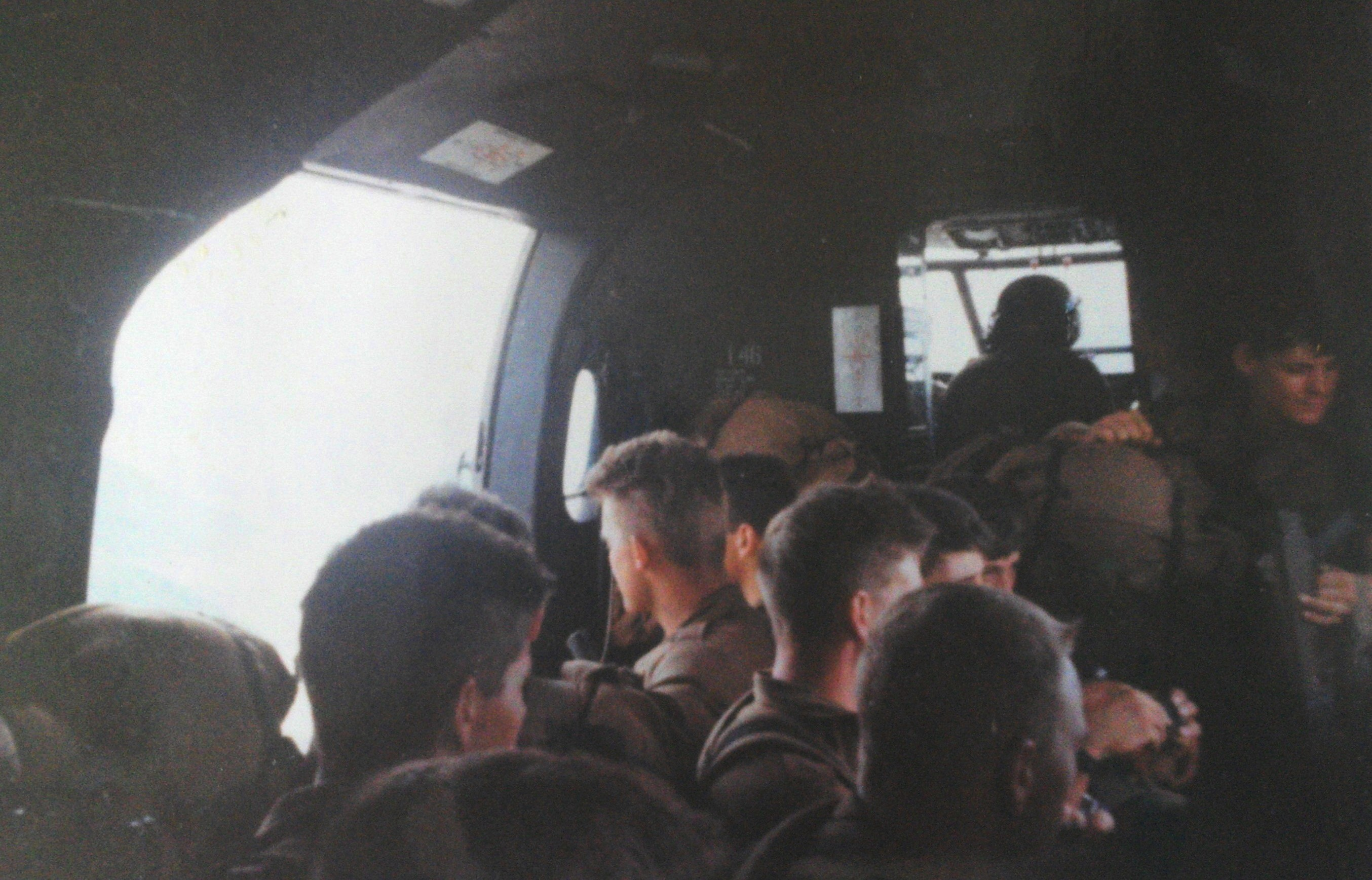
8 South African Infantry Battalion operatives in northern KwaZulu-Natal, 1993

During the 1980s the government, led by P.W. Botha, became increasingly preoccupied with security. It set up a powerful state security apparatus to "protect" the state against an anticipated upsurge in political violence that the reforms were expected to trigger. The 1980s became a period of considerable political unrest, with the government becoming increasingly dominated by Botha's circle of generals and police chiefs (known as securocrats), who managed the various States of Emergencies.

Botha's years in power were marked also by numerous military interventions in the states bordering South Africa, as well as an extensive military and political campaign to eliminate SWAPO in Namibia. Within South Africa, meanwhile, vigorous police action and strict enforcement of security legislation resulted in hundreds of arrests and bans, and an effective end to the African National Congress' sabotage campaign.

The government punished political offenders brutally. 40,000 people annually were subjected to whipping as a form of punishment. The vast majority had committed political offences and were lashed ten times for their crime. If convicted of treason, political offenders could be hanged.

As the 1980s progressed, more and more anti-apartheid organisations were formed and affiliated with the UDF. Led by the Reverend Allan Boesak and Albertina Sisulu, the UDF called for the government to abandon its reforms and instead abolish the apartheid system and eliminate the homelands completely.

Project Coast contributed to the operationalisation of covert weapon programs which targeted opponents of the apartheid regime, this include at least the lethal killing of 200 members of Namibia's liberation movement SWAPO, members of the Mozambique RENAMO rebel movement and the attempted assassination of senior figures associated with the ANC including Pallo Jordan and Ronnie Kasrils. A notable survivor, Frank Chikane, survived an assassination attempt with supplied poison from Project Coast.

=== State of emergency ===
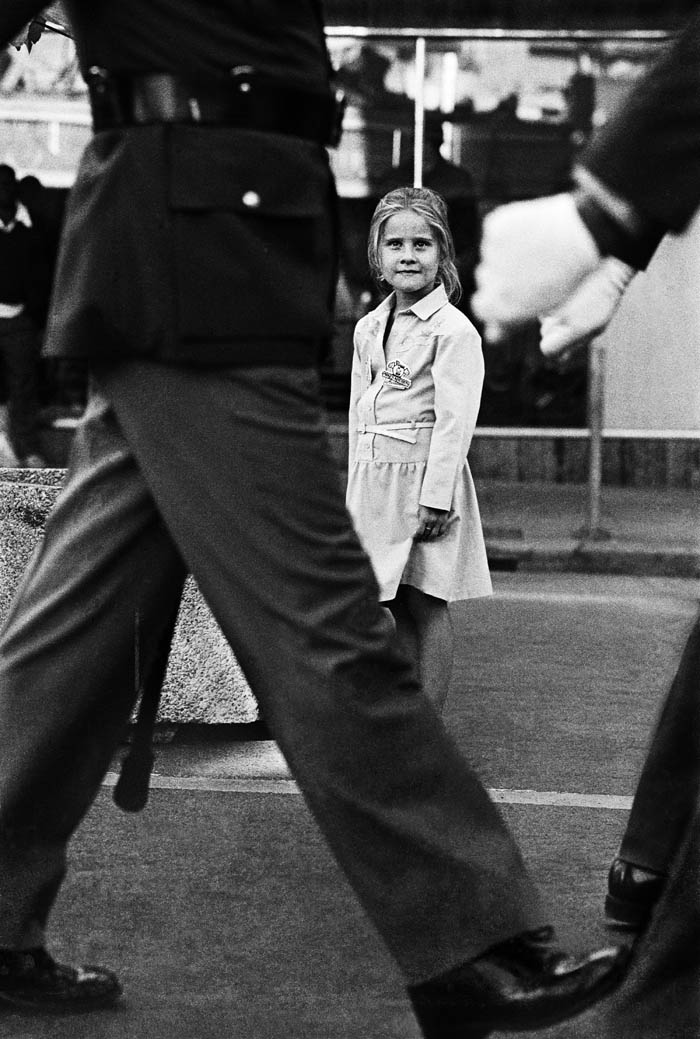
A little white girl in front of a parade of the South African Police in Pietermaritzburg (Natal), 1987

Serious political violence was a prominent feature from 1985 to 1989, as Black townships became the focus of the struggle between anti-apartheid organisations and the Botha government. Throughout the 1980s, township people resisted apartheid by acting against the local issues that faced their particular communities. The focus of much of this resistance was against the local authorities and their leaders, who were seen to be supporting the government. By 1985, it had become the ANC's aim to make Black townships "ungovernable" (a term later replaced by "people's power") by means of rent boycotts and other militant action. Numerous township councils were overthrown or collapsed, to be replaced by unofficial popular organisations, often led by militant youth. People's courts were set up, and residents accused of being government agents were dealt extreme and occasionally lethal punishments. Black town councillors and policemen, and sometimes their families, were attacked with petrol bombs, beaten, and murdered by necklacing after they were restrained by wrapping their wrists with barbed wire.

On 20 July 1985, Botha declared a State of Emergency in 36 magisterial districts. Areas affected were the Eastern Cape, and the PWV region ("Pretoria, Witwatersrand, Vereeniging"). Three months later, the Western Cape was included. An increasing number of organisations were banned or listed (restricted in some way); many individuals had restrictions such as house arrest imposed on them. During this state of emergency, about 2,436 people were detained under the Internal Security Act. This act gave police and the military sweeping powers. The government could implement curfews controlling the movement of people. The president could rule by decree without referring to the constitution or to parliament. It became a criminal offence to threaten someone verbally or possess documents that the government perceived to be threatening, to advise anyone to stay away from work or to oppose the government, and to disclose the name of anyone arrested under the State of Emergency until the government released that name, with up to ten years' imprisonment for these offences. Detention without trial became a common feature of the government's reaction to growing civil unrest and by 1988, 30,000 people had been detained. The media was censored, thousands were arrested and many were interrogated and tortured.

On 12 June 1986, four days before the tenth anniversary of the Soweto uprising, the state of emergency was extended to cover the whole country. The government amended the Public Security Act, including the right to declare "unrest" areas, allowing extraordinary measures to crush protests in these areas. Severe censorship of the press became a dominant tactic in the government's strategy and television cameras were banned from entering such areas. The state broadcaster, the South African Broadcasting Corporation (SABC), provided propaganda in support of the government. Media opposition to the system increased, supported by the growth of a pro-ANC underground press within South Africa.

In 1987, the State of Emergency was extended for another two years. Meanwhile, about 200,000 members of the National Union of Mineworkers commenced the longest strike (three weeks) in South African history. The year 1988 saw the banning of the activities of the UDF and other anti-apartheid organisations.

Much of the violence in the late-1980s and early-1990s was directed at the government, but a substantial amount was between the residents themselves. Many died in violence between members of Inkatha and the UDF-ANC faction. It was later proven that the government manipulated the situation by supporting one side or the other whenever it suited them. Government agents assassinated opponents within South Africa and abroad; they undertook cross-border army and air-force attacks on suspected ANC and PAC bases. The ANC and the PAC in return detonated bombs at restaurants, shopping centres and government buildings such as magistrates courts. Between 1960 and 1994, according to statistics from the Truth and Reconciliation Commission, the Inkatha Freedom Party was responsible for 4,500 deaths, South African security forces were responsible for 2,700 deaths and the ANC was responsible for 1,300 deaths.

The state of emergency continued until 1990 when it was lifted by State President F. W. de Klerk.

== Final years of apartheid ==
=== Causes ===
Philip Bonner highlights the "contradictory economic effects" of South Africa's industrialisation as the economy did not have a manufacturing sector, therefore promoting short term profitability but limiting labour productivity and the size of local markets. This also led to its collapse, as Clarkes "emphasises the economy could not provide and compete with foreign rivals as they failed to master cheap labour and complex chemistry". The contradictions in the traditionally capitalist economy of the apartheid state led to considerable debate about racial policy, and division and conflicts in the central state.

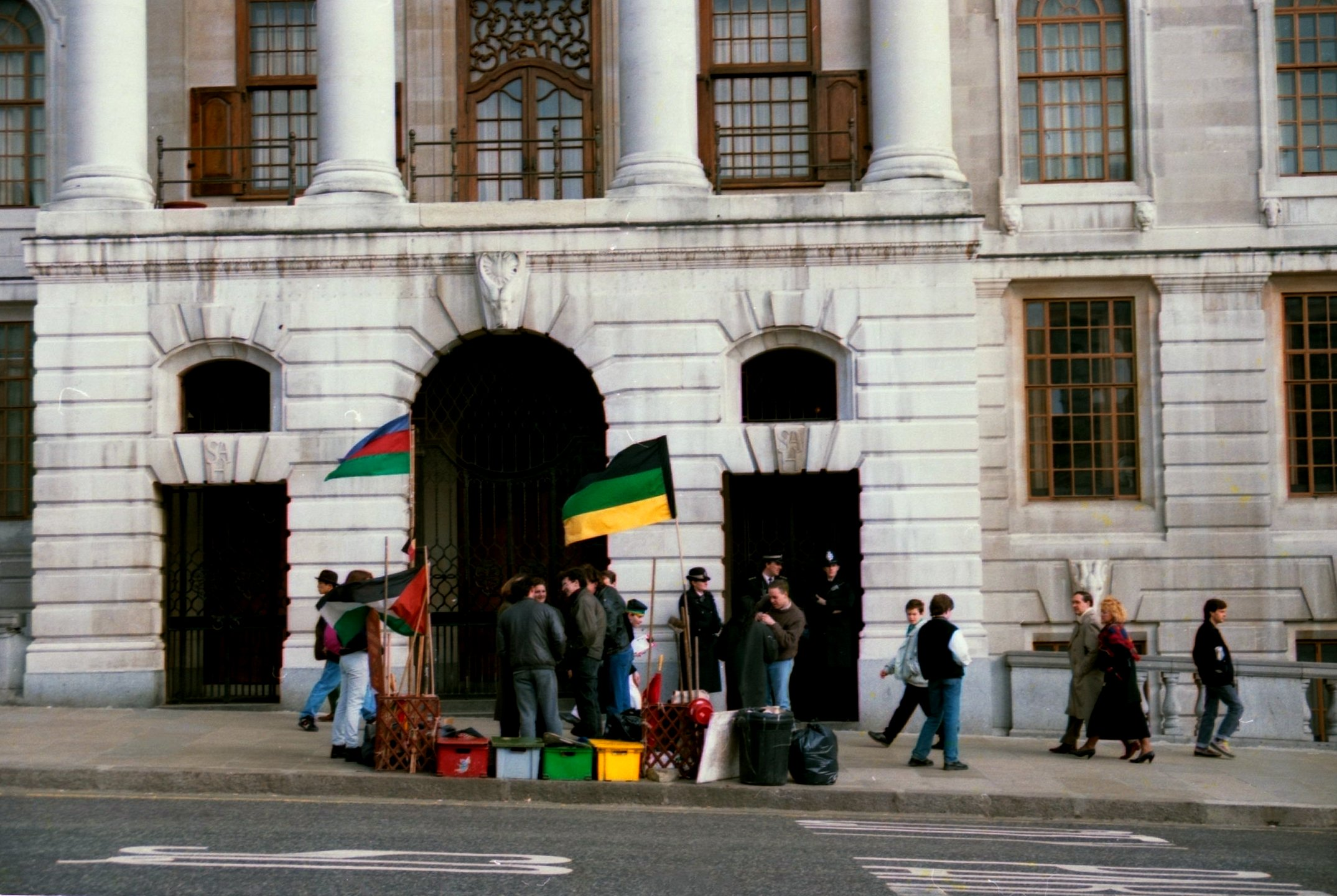
Anti-apartheid protest at South Africa House in London, 1989

In 1974, resistance to apartheid was encouraged by Portuguese withdrawal from Mozambique and Angola, after the 1974 Carnation Revolution. South African troops withdrew from Angola early in 1976, failing to prevent the MPLA from gaining power there, causing celebrations among Black students in South Africa.

The Mahlabatini Declaration of Faith, signed by Mangosuthu Buthelezi and Harry Schwarz in 1974, enshrined the principles of peaceful transition of power and equality for all. Its purpose was to provide a blueprint for South Africa by consent and racial peace in a multi-racial society, stressing opportunity for all, consultation, the federal concept, and a Bill of Rights. It caused a split in the United Party that ultimately realigned oppositional politics in South Africa with the formation of the Progressive Federal Party in 1977. The Declaration was the first of several such joint agreements by acknowledged Black and White political leaders in South Africa.

In 1978, the National Party Defence Minister, Pieter Willem Botha, became prime minister. His white minority regime worried about Soviet aid to revolutionaries in South Africa at the same time that South African economic growth had slowed. The South African Government noted that it was spending too much money to maintain segregated homelands created for Blacks, and the homelands were proving to be uneconomical. Nor was maintaining Blacks as third-class citizens working well. Black labour remained vital to the economy, and illegal Black labour unions were flourishing. Many Blacks remained too poor to contribute significantly to the economy through their purchasing power – although they composed more than 70% of the population. Botha's regime feared that an antidote was needed to prevent the Blacks being attracted to communism.

=== Tricameral parliament ===
In the early-1980s, Botha's National Party government started to recognise the inevitability of the need to reform the apartheid system. Early reforms were driven by a combination of internal violence, international condemnation, changes within the National Party's constituency, and changing demographics – whites constituted only 16% of the total population, in comparison to 20% fifty years earlier.

In 1983, a new constitution was passed implementing what was called the Tricameral Parliament, giving Coloureds and Indians voting rights and parliamentary representation in separate houses – the House of Assembly (178 members) for Whites, the House of Representatives (85 members) for Coloureds and the House of Delegates (45 members) for Indians. Each House handled laws pertaining to its racial group's "own affairs", including health, education and other community issues. All laws relating to "general affairs" (matters such as defence, industry, taxation and Black affairs) were handled by a Cabinet made up of representatives from all three houses. However, the White chamber had a large majority on this Cabinet, ensuring that effective control of the country remained in the hands of the White minority. Blacks, although making up the majority of the population, were excluded from representation; they remained nominal citizens of their homelands. The first Tricameral elections were largely boycotted by Coloured and Indian voters, amid widespread rioting.

=== Reforms and contact with the ANC under Botha ===
Black homelands were declared nation-states. Black labour unions were legitimised, the government recognised the right of Blacks to live in urban areas permanently and gave Blacks property rights there. Interest was expressed in rescinding the law against interracial marriage and also rescinding the law against sexual relations between different races, which was under ridicule abroad. The spending for Black schools increased, to one-seventh of what was spent per white child, up from one-sixteenth in 1968. At the same time, attention was given to strengthening the effectiveness of the police apparatus.

In January 1985, Botha addressed the government's House of Assembly and stated that the government was willing to release Mandela on condition that he pledge opposition to acts of violence to further political objectives. Mandela's reply was read in public by his daughter Zinzi – his first words distributed publicly since his sentence to prison 21 years earlier. Mandela described violence as the responsibility of the apartheid regime and said that with democracy there would be no need for violence. The crowd listening to the reading of his speech erupted in cheers and chants. This response helped to further elevate Mandela's status in the eyes of those, both internationally and domestically, who opposed apartheid.

Between 1986 and 1988, some petty apartheid laws were repealed, along with the pass laws. Botha told White South Africans to "adapt or die" and twice he wavered on the eve of what were billed as "rubicon" announcements of substantial reforms, although on both occasions he backed away from substantial changes. Ironically, these reforms served only to trigger intensified political violence through the remainder of the 1980s as more communities and political groups across the country joined the resistance movement. Botha's government stopped short of substantial reforms, such as lifting the ban on the ANC, PAC and SACP and other liberation organisations, releasing political prisoners, or repealing the foundation laws of grand apartheid. The government's stance was that they would not contemplate negotiating until those organisations "renounced violence".

By 1987, South Africa's economy was growing at one of the lowest rates in the world, and the ban on South African participation in international sporting events was frustrating many whites in South Africa. Examples of African states with Black leaders and White minorities existed in Kenya and Zimbabwe. Whispers of South Africa one day having a Black President sent more hardline whites into supporting right-wing political parties.

A number of clandestine meetings were held between the ANC-in-exile and various sectors of the internal struggle, such as women and educationalists. More overtly, a group of White intellectuals met the ANC in Senegal for talks known as the Dakar Conference.

=== Presidency of F. W. de Klerk ===
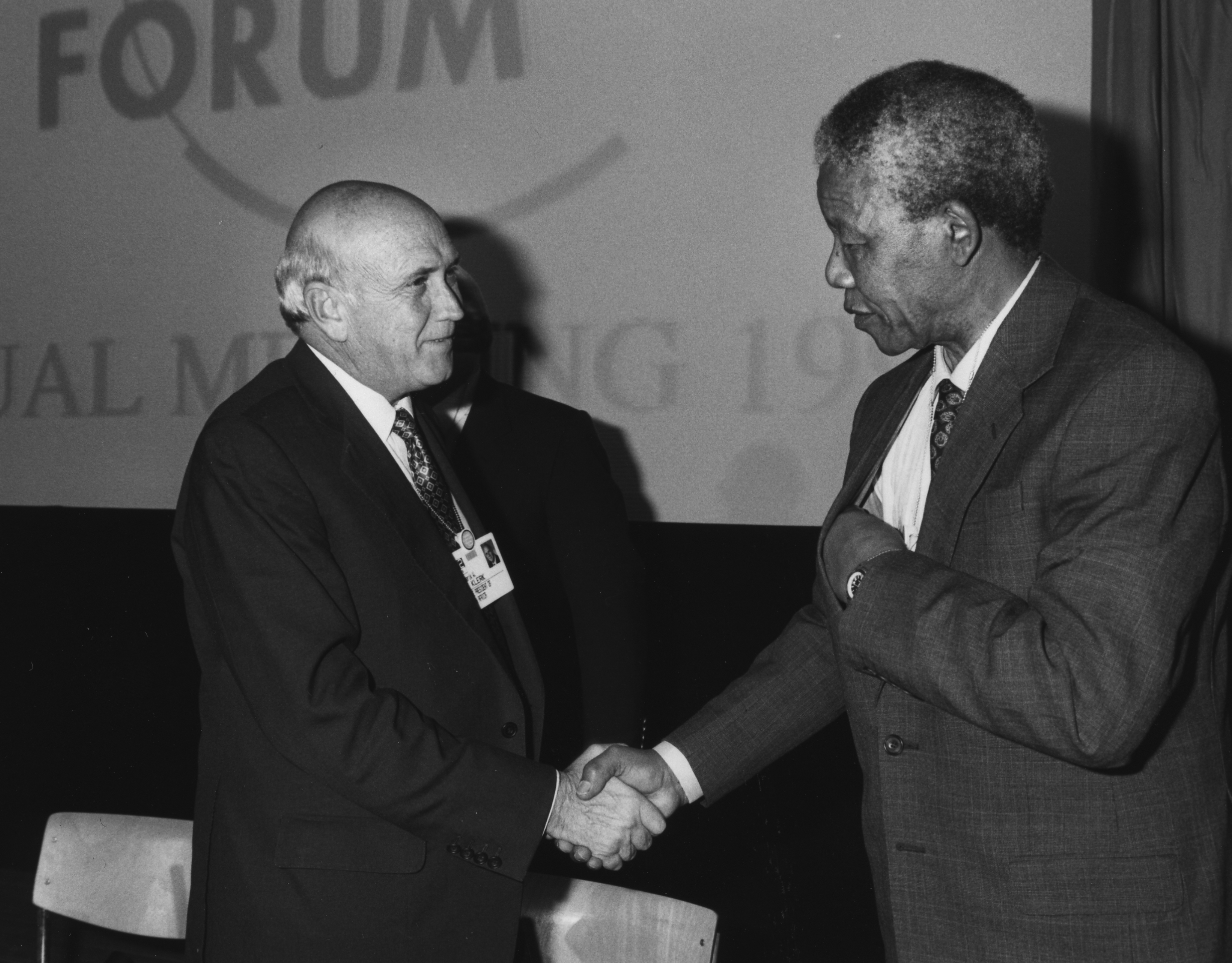
De Klerk and Mandela in Davos, 1992

Early in 1989, Botha had a stroke; he was prevailed upon to resign in February 1989. He was succeeded as president later that year by F. W. de Klerk. Despite his initial reputation as a conservative, de Klerk moved decisively towards negotiations to end the political stalemate in the country. In his opening address to parliament on 2 February 1990. F. W. de Klerk announced that he would repeal discriminatory laws and lift the 30-year ban on leading anti-apartheid groups. The Land Act was brought to an end. F. W. de Klerk also made his first public commitment to suspend the death penalty. Media restrictions were lifted and political prisoners not guilty of common law crimes were released.

Having been instructed by the UN Security Council to end its long-standing involvement in South West Africa/Namibia, and in the face of military stalemate in Southern Angola, and an escalation in the size and cost of the combat with the Cubans, the Angolans, and SWAPO forces and the growing cost of the border war, South Africa negotiated a change of control; Namibia became independent on 21 March 1990.

=== Negotiations ===
Apartheid was dismantled in a series of negotiations from 1990 to 1991, culminating in a transitional period which resulted in the country's 1994 general election, the first in South Africa held with universal suffrage.

In 1990, negotiations were earnestly begun, with two meetings between the government and the ANC. The purpose of the negotiations was to pave the way for talks towards a peaceful transition towards majority rule. These meetings were successful in laying down the preconditions for negotiations, despite the considerable tensions still abounding within the country. Apartheid legislation was abolished in 1991.

At the first meeting, the NP and ANC discussed the conditions for negotiations to begin. The meeting was held at Groote Schuur, the President's official residence. They released the Groote Schuur Minute, which said that before negotiations commenced political prisoners would be freed and all exiles allowed to return.

There were fears that the change of power would be violent. To avoid this, it was essential that a peaceful resolution between all parties be reached. In December 1991, the Convention for a Democratic South Africa (CODESA) began negotiations on the formation of a multiracial transitional government and a new constitution extending political rights to all groups. CODESA adopted a Declaration of Intent and committed itself to an "undivided South Africa".

Reforms and negotiations to end apartheid led to a backlash among the right-wing White opposition, leading to the Conservative Party winning a number of by-elections against NP candidates. De Klerk responded by calling a Whites-only referendum in March 1992 to decide whether negotiations should continue. 69% voted in favour, and the victory instilled in de Klerk and the government a lot more confidence, giving the NP a stronger position in negotiations.

When negotiations resumed in May 1992, under the tag of CODESA II, stronger demands were made. The ANC and the government could not reach a compromise on how power should be shared during the transition to democracy. The NP wanted to retain a strong position in a transitional government, and the power to change decisions made by parliament.

Persistent violence added to the tension during the negotiations. This was due mostly to the intense rivalry between the Inkatha Freedom Party (IFP) and the ANC and the eruption of some traditional tribal and local rivalries between the Zulu and Xhosa historical tribal affinities, especially in the Southern Natal provinces. Although Mandela and Buthelezi met to settle their differences, they could not stem the violence. One of the worst cases of ANC-IFP violence was the Boipatong massacre of 17 June 1992, which offered the ANC a pretext to engage in brinkmanship. Mandela argued that de Klerk, as head of state, was responsible for bringing an end to the bloodshed. He also accused the South African police of inciting the ANC-IFP violence. This formed the basis for ANC's withdrawal from the negotiations, and the CODESA forum broke down completely at this stage. The Bisho massacre on 7 September 1992 worsened the situation.

Right-wing violence also added to the hostilities of this period. The assassination of Chris Hani on 10 April 1993 proved a turning point in the negotiations, after which the main parties pushed for a settlement with increased determination. On 25 June 1993, the AWB used an armoured vehicle to crash through the doors of the Kempton Park World Trade Centre where talks were still going ahead under the Negotiating Council, though this did not derail the process.

In addition to the continuing "black-on-black" violence, there were a number of attacks on white civilians (Note: In the St James Church massacre on 25 July 1993, members of the APLA opened fire in a church in Cape Town, killing 11 members of the congregation and wounding 58.) by the PAC's military wing, the Azanian People's Liberation Army (APLA). The PAC was hoping to strengthen their standing by attracting the support of the angry, impatient youth.

Violence persisted right up to the 1994 general election. The Truth and Reconciliation Commission found that there were 21,000 deaths from political violence between 1948 and 1994, with 7,000 deaths between 1948 and 1989, and 14,000 deaths and 22,000 injuries in the transition period between 1990 and 1994.

Lucas Mangope, leader of the Bophuthatswana homeland, declared that it would not take part in the elections. It had been decided that, once the temporary constitution had come into effect, the homelands would be incorporated into South Africa, but Mangope did not want this to happen. There were strong protests against his decision, leading to a coup d'état in Bophuthatswana carried out by the SDF on 10 March that deposed Mangope. AWB militants attempted to intervene in hopes of maintaining Mangope in power. Fighting alongside black paramilitaries loyal to Mangope they were unsuccessful, with 3 AWB militants being killed during this intervention, and harrowing images of the bloodshed shown on national television and in newspapers across the world.

=== 1994 election ===
The new multicoloured flag of South Africa adopted in 1994 to mark the end of Apartheid

The election was held on 27 April 1994 and went off peacefully throughout the country as 20 million South Africans cast their votes. The ANC won 62.65% of the vote, less than the 66.7 percent that would have allowed it to rewrite the constitution. 252 of the 400 seats went to members of the African National Congress. The NP captured most of the White and Coloured votes and became the official opposition party. The Government of National Unity was established, its cabinet made up of 12 ANC representatives, six from the NP, and three from the IFP. Thabo Mbeki and de Klerk were made deputy presidents.

== Legacy ==
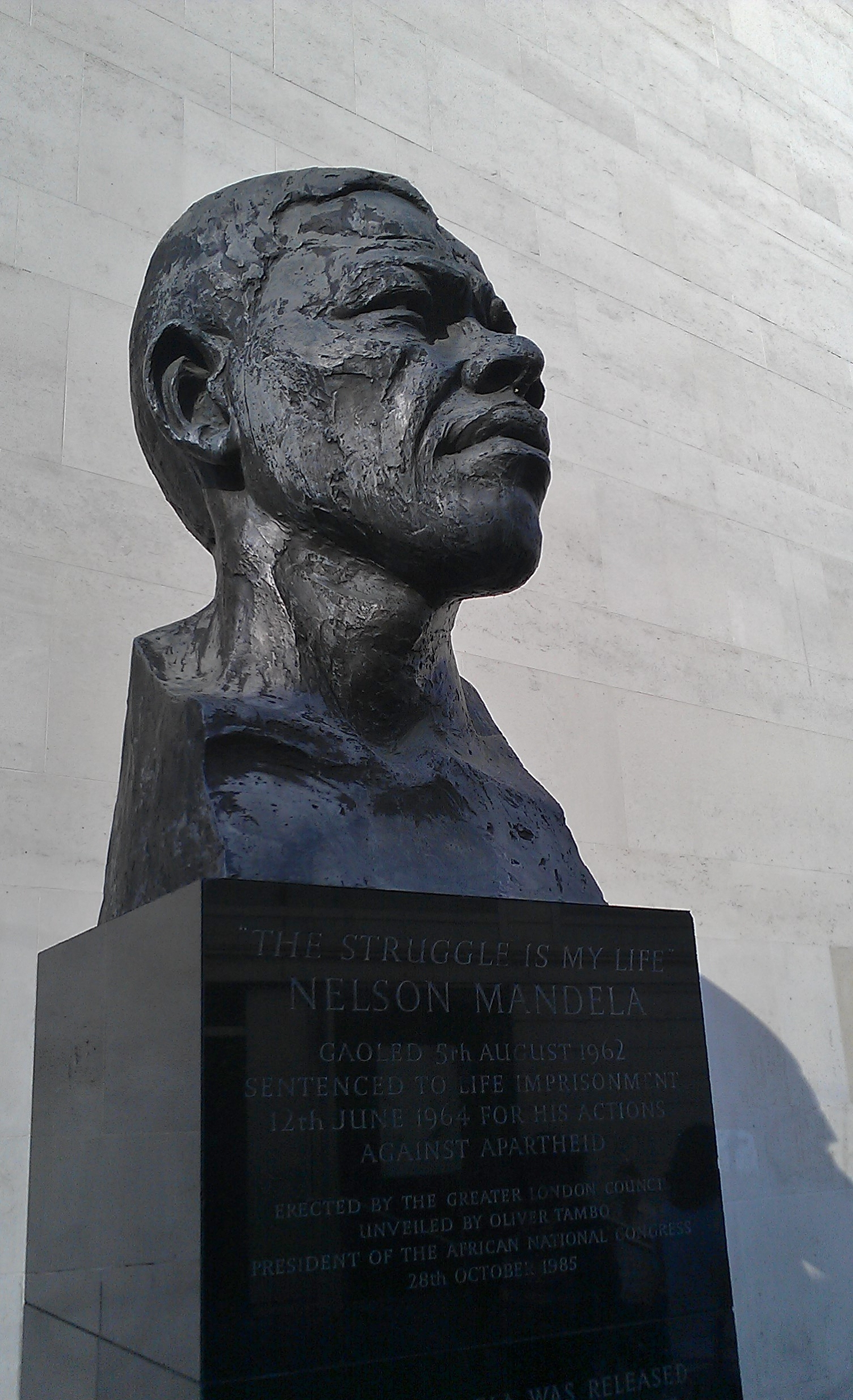
Bust of Nelson Mandela erected on London's South Bank. Mandela is widely considered a global hero for his role in opposing the apartheid system and inaugurating a multiracial democracy.

=== Inequality ===
Post-apartheid South Africa has struggled to correct the social inequalities created by decades of apartheid. White nepotism remains a considerable obstacle to economic gain and political influence for Black South Africans. Despite a growing gross domestic product, indices for poverty, unemployment, income inequality, life expectancy and land ownership, have declined. No industry in the economy has over 50% ownership by Black individuals in terms of their share even though 81.4% of the South African population is Black. The end of the apartheid system in South Africa has largely not changed the socioeconomic stratification by race. While a small subset of the Black population have been able to create a Black middle class that did not exist during apartheid, the large majority of Black people in South Africa have yet to experience a difference in economic class since apartheid was abolished. According to the World Bank, South Africa is the most economically unequal country in the world.

=== Contrition ===
Since 2019, publicly displaying the 1928–1994 flag in South Africa is banned and it is classified as hate speech. Individuals previously supporting apartheid have made public apologies, such as F. W. de Klerk (Note: F. W. de Klerk in 1997 stated: "I apologise in my capacity as leader of the NP to the millions who suffered wrenching disruption of forced removals; who suffered the shame of being arrested for pass law offences; who over the decades suffered the indignities and humiliation of racial discrimination." In a video released after his death in 2021, he apologised one last time for apartheid, both on a personal level and in his capacity as former president.), Marthinus van Schalkwyk, (Note: Marthinus van Schalkwyk: "The National Party brought development to a section of South Africa, but also brought suffering through a system grounded on injustice", in a statement shortly after the National Party voted to disband in 2005.) Adriaan Vlok (Note: In 2006 Adriaan Vlok washed the feet of apartheid victim Frank Chikane in an act of apology for the wrongs of the Apartheid regime.) and Leon Wessels (Note: Leon Wessels: "I am now more convinced than ever that apartheid was a terrible mistake that blighted our land. South Africans did not listen to the laughing and the crying of each other. I am sorry that I had been so hard of hearing for so long".).

=== Other applications of the term ===
The South African experience has given rise to the term "apartheid" being used in a number of contexts other than the South African system of racial segregation. It has been used to describe the Israeli occupation in the West Bank, legal treatment of illegal settlements and the West Bank barrier.

The "crime of apartheid" was enshrined into international law by the 1976 UN International Convention on the Suppression and Punishment of the Crime of Apartheid and the 2002 Rome Statute (according to which it is a crime against humanity).

Multiple concepts also use the term "apartheid", such as social apartheid (such as social apartheid in Brazil), gender apartheid, religious apartheid (such as northern Ireland's "self-imposed apartheid"), occupational apartheid, carceral apartheid, global apartheid and technological apartheid.

== See also ==
- Allegations of apartheid by country
- Apartheid in international law
- Apartheid legislation in South Africa
- Apartheid in art and literature
- Discrimination based on skin color
- Foreign relations of South Africa during apartheid
- Index of racism-related articles
- Legacies of apartheid
- Music in the movement against apartheid
- Racial hierarchy
- Racial segregation
- Racism by country

== Notes and references ==
=== Bibliography ===
- Clark, Nancy; Worger, William (2016). South Africa: The Rise and Fall of Apartheid (3 ed.). New York: Routledge. doi:10.4324/9781315621562. ISBN 978-1-315-62156-2.
- Du Toit, A.; Giliomee, H. B. (1983). Afrikaner political thought: analysis and documents. University of California Press. ISBN 978-0-520-04319-0.
- Kaplan, Irving (1970). Area Handbook for the Republic of South Africa (PDF). Archived (PDF) from the original on 28 April 2015.
- Naidoo, Josephine C.; Rajab, Devi Moodley (1 September 2005). "The Dynamics of Oppression". Psychology and Developing Societies. 17 (2): 139–159. doi:10.1177/097133360501700204. S2CID 145782935.
- O'Meara, Dan (1996). Forty Lost Years: The National Party and the Politics of the South African State 1948–1994. Athens: Ohio University Press.
