= Technological apartheid =

Technological apartheid is the denial of useful modern technologies to Third World or developing nations. The term is based upon the South African term apartheid, partly refers to the practice of keeping certain populations in a separate, lower-class status. It has been used to describe situations that are unintended, such as the absence of computers and information technology in the favelas of Brazil or other impoverished areas.

Some of the technologies in question are dual-use technologies, advanced technologies which can have both civilian and military applications. Some commentators allege that the issue of dual-use technologies is a red herring, and that some advanced-sector nations, who wish to keep the Third World nations as poor client states, withhold technologies that are essential for economic development, using the pretext that they will be used for military purposes.
