= Swiss–South African Association =

Swiss non-profit organisation

The Swiss–South African Association was an organization based in Switzerland, founded in Zurich in May 1956 to promote relations with South Africa and to function as a Chamber of Commerce. A number of prominent business personalities were active in the association, such as Adolf Jann (general director of UBS), Ernst Schmidheiny (president of Holderbank), Dieter Bührle (general director and owner of Oerlikon-Bührle) and Georg Sulzer (president of Sulzer Gebrüder AG).

At the time of its founding, the association had 47 individual members and 81 companies as members. However, over the years it became more dominated by individual membership.

Adolf Jann was the founding president of the association. In 1964 the presidency was passed over to Sulzer. In 1984 Anton Ernst Schrafl became president; Georg Meyer (Vice President of UBS) took over as president in 1988. In October 1988 Meyer was decorated by the South African president P. W. Botha with the Order of Good Hope.

Politically, the association defended the Apartheid regime in South Africa. In the bulletins of the association, white supremacy in South Africa was defended in terms of their "right to exist". Political equality between Whites and Blacks was portrayed as problematic, if not impossible (an analogy also extended to the United States). Upon the foundation of the first Bantustan state, Transkei, the association lobbied the Swiss government to recognize the new state.

In 1997 the association hosted president Nelson Mandela at a meeting (a few years earlier, the bulletin of the association had ridiculed Mandela and labelled him mentally unfit to lead the country). In 1999 the Swiss–South African Association merged into the Swiss–South African Chamber of Commerce (founded in 1996 and based in Zug).
