= Baasskap =

Afrikaans term for white minority rule in South Africa

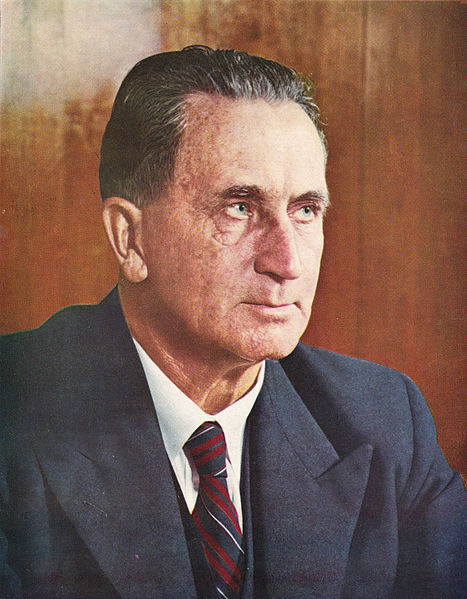
J. G. Strijdom, Prime Minister of South Africa (1954–1958), an uncompromising supporter of baaskap

Baasskap ([ˈbɑːskap]; also spelled baaskap), literally 'boss-ship' or 'boss-hood', was a political philosophy prevalent during South African apartheid. It advocated the social, political and economic domination of South Africa by its minority white population generally and by Afrikaners in particular. The term is sometimes translated into English as "Chief in Charge" and functioned either as a description or an endorsement of the "owner of slaves" in South Africa.

== Proponents ==
Proponents of baasskap constituted the largest faction of apartheid ideologues in the National Party and state institutions. They applied racial segregation in a systematic way to "preserve racial purity" and to ensure that economic and political spheres were dominated by Afrikaners. However, proponents of baasskap were not necessarily opposed to black South African participation in the economy if black labour was controlled in a way that preserved economic domination by Afrikaners.

Proponents of baasskap included both J.G. Strijdom, Prime Minister from 1954 to 1958, and C.R. Swart, Minister of Justice from 1948 to 1959. Hendrik Verwoerd (Prime Minister from 1958 to 1966) had sympathy for the "purist" faction of apartheid ideologues, who opposed economic integration of black South Africans, in contrast to supporters of baasskap who wanted white domination but an integrated economy. However, rather than simply rejecting baasskap, Verwoerd transformed its crude concept of white domination by reframing it as a policy of "separate development"—presenting racial segregation not as oppression, but as allowing each racial group to achieve self-determination in their own designated territories. This intellectual repackaging gave the underlying goals of baasskap a veneer of respectability.

== See also ==
- Minoritarianism
