= Lusaka Manifesto =

1969 declaration of African heads of state on human rights and white supremacy rule

The Lusaka Manifesto (originally the Manifesto on Southern Africa) is a document created by the Fifth Summit Conference of East and Central African States which took place between 14 and 16 April 1969 in Lusaka, the capital of Zambia. Produced at a time when the Republic of South Africa and its affiliated white-ruled regimes in Mozambique, Rhodesia, and Angola were relatively strong but politically isolated, the Manifesto called upon them to relinquish white supremacy and minority rule and singled out apartheid South Africa for violation of human rights. In the manifesto, which was subsequently adopted both by the Organisation of African Unity and the United Nations, thirteen Heads of State offered dialogue with the rulers of these Southern African states under the condition that they accept basic principles of human rights and human liberties. They also threatened to support the various liberation wars if negotiations failed.

The Lusaka Manifesto represented one of two strategies to deal with white minority rule in Southern Africa: To try to contain violence, preserve the status quo, and improve the humanitarian situation little by little through diplomatic means, small reforms, and compromises. The other strategy, to wage independence wars, would eventually prevail.

== Background ==
In the late 1960s South Africa's apartheid regime became increasingly politically isolated, both internationally and continental. Under Prime Minister B.J. Vorster it developed the so-called "outward-looking policy", an effort to bind southern African countries economically, and in this way to discourage them from openly criticising its repressive internal politics. This policy was at first openly opposed only by Tanzania under president Julius Nyerere and Zambia under Kenneth Kaunda, but their lobbying made the United Nations General Assembly (UNGA) reject any further dialogue with South Africa.

At that time independence movements had been formed in all white-ruled territories of Southern Africa, either with an explicit commitment to guerrilla warfare and sabotage or recently having scaled their activities from passive resistance, petitioning, and lobbying to an openly armed struggle. The African National Congress (ANC) in South Africa had launched its military wing Umkhonto we Sizwe (MK) in 1961. It immediately executed several sabotage acts against the country's infrastructure. In South-West Africa SWAPO's paramilitary wing, the People's Liberation Army of Namibia (PLAN) was founded in 1962, its first military action occurred in Omugulugwombashe in 1966.

Yet South Africa was politically strong at the time of the declaration agreed upon in Lusaka. Its border states except Botswana were all ruled by white minorities. In the United States, National Security Study Memorandum number 39, issued by US president Richard Nixon and Secretary of State Henry Kissinger, had just reiterated that "the Whites in southern Africa [are] there to stay". Memorandum 39, nicknamed Tar baby memorandum for its reluctant acceptance of apartheid and minority rule in order to gain anti-communist allies in Southern Africa, strengthened South Africa's position internationally.

Prime Minister Vorster had had a secret conversation with Kaunda for some time since 1968, eventually leading to the manifesto. A threat to reveal existence and content of this conversation was issued by Vorster to influence Kaunda's public presentation of South African politics. When Kaunda did not react, Vorster published the complete exchange and later in 1970 confirmed it in the South African parliament.

== Content ==
The manifesto starts with a declaration on human rights and equality and specifically rejects racial discrimination, both the then existing White minority racism against Blacks and discrimination by Blacks against Whites, a widespread fear of the White minorities at that time. It further offers dialogue to the White regime in South Africa, stating that the signatories would "negotiate rather than destroy, talk rather than kill".

For Namibia, Mozambique, Rhodesia and Angola the manifesto called for self-determination and the establishment of majority rule. For South Africa its tone was sharper, and its recommendations went much further, including the suggestion to expel South Africa from all international political and economic bodies. This distinction between the suggested treatment of South Africa and the other white-ruled territories also contained an acknowledgement of South Africa's status as an independent, sovereign UN member, while Namibia, Mozambique, Rhodesia and Angola were colonies without recognition as states.

== Significance ==
The significance of the Lusaka Manifesto has been compared to that of the Magna Carta and the Freedom Charter. The liberalism expressed in it was in direct opposition to South African apartheid which saw rights and liberties of individual people as tantamount to communism, and as irreconcilable with its own nationalist policies.

The manifesto was published in Britain in form of an advertisement, paid for by the Zambian government, in The Times and The Guardian. It was endorsed by the Organisation of African Unity (OAU) and by the 24th session of the United Nations General Assembly (UNGA).

The OAU issued several other documents after the Lusaka Manifesto that concerned the situation in South Africa, for instance the Mogadishu Declaration of 1970 and the Dar es Salaam Declaration of 1974. They were mainly updates, without a real diversion from the manifesto's general direction, although, in reaction to South Africa's complete rejection of the original document, they are written in a decisively tenser tone and stress much more the support of armed liberation movements.

== Reception ==
North America and former colonial powers in Europe positively received the Lusaka Manifesto, reportedly "because Africa argued, not shouted".

The manifesto was a document in the moderate line of thought on how to improve the situation of Blacks in Southern Africa. It acknowledged the right of all the whites who had settled in southern Africa to stay there. It recognized South Africa as a sovereign and independent state and proposed no changes of boundaries. It advocated boycott and isolation, rather than armed intervention or internal revolt, in South Africa. Above all, it urged negotiation and accepted that change could not come overnight.

The Lusaka Manifesto has been criticised for not involving any of the contemporary liberation movements and, more generally, of entrenching capitalism on the African continent rather than supporting the various socialist movements of that time.

The White South African regime rejected the document. The ANC was likewise opposed to the Lusaka Manifesto as in their view the declaration legitimised the apartheid regime, pronouncing its status as a sovereign and independent UN-recognised entity. They further criticised that the call for a peaceful resolution came at a time South Africa intervened militarily in Rhodesia, and that the Manifesto's wording artificially separated the liberation struggles in South Africa, South-West Africa, and Rhodesia. In 1971 the ANC stated that:

It is a tragedy that now—when black South Africa is launching an unflinching, full scale armed struggle against Vorster and his henchmen—African States [...] have seen it fit to have a 'dialogue' with white South Africa [...] If there should be a dialogue it should be between Voster and the real leaders of the people, Mandela, Sisulu, Mbeki, Kathrada, Fischer, Motsoaledi.

ANC's main disappointment, though, was that its armed struggle, and that of its likeminded liberation movements FRELIMO, MPLA, SWAPO, ZANU, and ZAPU was not directly supported and rather seen as a possible future legitimate action, even if it already was in full swing.

In the spirit of the manifesto, Namibia conducted the Turnhalle Constitutional Conference between 1975 and 1977, an event widely criticised for providing "pseudo-reforms" entrenching the racial segregation of Namibia's population, and indirectly reinforcing the economic and political power of the white population. Several black delegates, however, welcomed the start of institutionalised communication between the parties.

Rhodesia's Ian Smith entered into several round of talks with ZANU and ZAPU. These were, however, interspersed with military action, at times supported by South Africa. In 1975 the talks finally broke down, and the Frontline States supported armed liberation from 1976 onwards.

Angola and Mozambique already were in a state of full-scale wars of independence, Angola since 1961 and Mozambique since 1964. The manifesto made no difference to the developments in these countries. After a successful coup d'état in Portugal on 25 April 1974 the Portuguese colonial power collapsed, and Portuguese colonies were allowed to establish majority-rule governments. This development encouraged liberation movements in other white-ruled territories as well. Following the Alvor Agreement in January 1975 Angola became independent in November, ending its war of independence but starting a devastating civil war. Mozambique likewise became independent in 1975 and saw its own civil war from 1977 to 1992.

== Aftermath ==
Only a few years after the Lusaka Manifesto the buffer of white-ruled countries north of South Africa disintegrated rapidly, forcing the apartheid regime to take a different course of politics. Mid 1976 uprisings in Soweto and Gugulethu brought the country to the brink of a civil war. The Southern African Development Coordination Conference (SADCC), the predecessor of today's Southern African Development Community (SADC) was founded in 1980 in order to "reduce member states' dependence, particularly, but not only, on apartheid South Africa". The white rulers of South Africa eventually relinquished power to the black majority in 1994 but instead of acting on the moderate suggestions of the manifesto faced independence wars in all affected countries.
