= List of acts of the Parliament of South Africa, 1950–1959 =

This is a list of acts of the Parliament of South Africa enacted in the years 1950 to 1959.

South African acts are uniquely identified by the year of passage and an act number within that year. Some acts have gone by more than one short title in the course of their existence; in such cases each title is listed with the years in which it applied.

== 1950 ==
Act no.	Short title
1	Additional Appropriation Act, 1950
2	General Loans Amendment Act, 1950
3	Part Appropriation Act, 1950
4	Unauthorized Expenditure (1948–1949) Act, 1950
5	Iron and Steel Industry Amendment Act, 1950
6	Electricity Amendment Act, 1950
7	South African Mutual Life Assurance Society Amendment (Private) Act, 1950
8	Atomic Energy Amendment Act, 1950
9	Railways and Harbours Part Appropriation Act, 1950
10	Second Additional Appropriation Act, 1950
11	Railways and Harbours Additional Appropriation Act, 1950
12	Railways and Harbours Unauthorized Expenditure Act, 1950
13	Medical, Dental and Pharmacy Amendment Act, 1950
14	Land Surveyors' Registration Act, 1950
15	Asiatic Land Tenure Amendment Act, 1950
16	Privy Council Appeals Act, 1950
17	Rand Water Board Statutes (Private) Act, 1950
18	Aviation Amendment Act, 1950
19	Potchefstroomse Universiteit vir Christelike Hoër Onderwys (Private) Act, 1950
20	Administrators' Powers (Validation) Act, 1950
21	Immorality Amendment Act, 1950
22	Copyright Amendment Act, 1950
23	Olifantsnek Irrigation District Adjustment Act, 1950
24	Breede River Conservation District Adjustment Act, 1950
25	Fishing Industry Development Amendment Act, 1950
26	Cape Town Foreshore Act, 1950
27	Geneva General Agreement on Tariffs and Trade Amendment Act, 1950
28	Government Villages Act, 1950
29	War Measures Continuation Act, 1950
30	Population Registration Act, 1950
31	Financial Relations Amendment Act, 1950
32	Pensions (Supplementary) Act, 1950
33	Customs Amendment Act, 1950
34	Excise Amendment Act, 1950
35	Income Tax Act, 1950
36	Finance Act, 1950
37	Companies Amendment Act, 1950
38	Dairy Industry Control Amendment Act, 1950
39	South Africa Act Amendment Act, 1950
40	Klipfontein Organic Products Corporation Act, 1950
41	Group Areas Act, 1950
42	Silicosis Amendment Act, 1950
43	Rents Act, 1950
44	Suppression of Communism Act, 1950 (before 1976); Internal Security Act, 1950 (after 1976)
45	Railways and Harbours Appropriation Act, 1950
46	Natal Native High Court Amendment Act, 1950
47	Public Servants (Temporary Employees) Amendment Act, 1950
48	Fertilizers, Farm Feeds, Seeds and Remedies Amendment Act, 1950
49	Appropriation Act, 1950

== 1951 ==
Act no.	Short title
1	Electricity Supply Commission Loan Agreement Act, 1951
2	Additional Appropriation Act, 1951
3	General Loans Amendment Act, 1951
4	Coinage Amendment Act, 1951
5	Workmen's Compensation Amendment Act, 1951
6	Natural Oil Amendment Act, 1951
7	AVBOB Mutual Assurance Society Incorporation (Private) Act, 1951
8	Jury Lists Amendment Act, 1951
9	Railways and Harbours Additional Appropriation Act, 1951
10	Second Additional Appropriation Act, 1951
11	Railways and Harbours Appropriation Act, 1951
12	Part Appropriation Act, 1951
13	Children's (Amendment) Act, 1951
14	Liquor Law Amendment Act, 1951
15	Special Schools Amendment Act, 1951 (before 1960); Special Education Amendment Act, 1951 (after 1960)
16	Railways and Harbours Unauthorized Expenditure Act, 1951
17	Blind Persons Amendment Act, 1951
18	Kopjes Irrigation Settlement Amendment Act, 1951
19	Jury Trials Amendment Act, 1951
20	Police Amendment Act, 1951
21	Unauthorized Expenditure (1949–1950) Act, 1951
22	Fishing Industry Development Amendment Act, 1951
23	Medical, Dental and Pharmacy Amendment Act, 1951
24	South African Tourist Corporation Amendment Act, 1951
25	Scientific Research Council Amendment Act, 1951
26	Merchandise Marks Amendment Act, 1951
27	Native Building Workers Act, 1951 (before 1964); Bantu Building Workers Act, 1951 (from 1964 to 1978); Black Building Workers Act, 1951 (after 1978)
28	Apprenticeship Amendment Act, 1951
29	Copyright Amendment Act, 1951
30	University of South Africa Amendment Act, 1951
31	Base Mineral Investigation Act, 1951
32	Explosives Amendment Act, 1951
33	Standards Amendment Act, 1951
34	Crawfish Export Amendment Act, 1951 (before 1953); Rock Lobster Export Amendment Act, 1951 (after 1953)
35	Births and Deaths Registration Amendment Act, 1951
36	Agricultural Produce Export Amendment Act, 1951
37	Registration of Pedigree Livestock Amendment Act, 1951
38	Training of Artisans Act, 1951
39	Expropriation (Establishment of Undertakings) Act, 1951
40	Industrial Development Amendment Act, 1951
41	Banking Amendment Act, 1951
42	Land Bank Amendment Act, 1951
43	Saldanha Bay Water Supply Amendment Act, 1951
44	Defence Amendment Act, 1951
45	Marketing Amendment Act, 1951
46	Separate Representation of Voters Act, 1951
47	Pension Laws Amendment Act, 1951
48	Pensions (Supplementary) Act, 1951
49	Railway Construction Act, 1951
50	Suppression of Communism Amendment Act, 1951
51	Public Accountants' and Auditors' Act, 1951
52	Prevention of Illegal Squatting Act, 1951
53	Rents Amendment Act, 1951
54	Public Servants' (Temporary Employees and Re-appointments) Act, 1951
55	South-West Africa Affairs Amendment Act, 1951
56	Finance Act, 1951
57	Merchant Shipping Act, 1951
58	Removal of Restrictions in Townships Amendment Act, 1951
59	Transfer Duty Amendment Act, 1951
60	Death Duties Amendment Act, 1951
61	Excise Amendment Act, 1951
62	Customs Amendment Act, 1951
63	Railways and Harbours Acts Amendment Act, 1951
64	Income Tax Act, 1951
65	War Measures Continuation Amendment Act, 1951
66	South Africa Act Amendment Act, 1951
67	Companies Amendment Act, 1951
68	Bantu Authorities Act, 1951 (before 1978); Black Authorities Act, 1951 (after 1978)
69	Appropriation Act, 1951
70	Parliamentary Service Pensions Act, 1951 (before 1958); Parliamentary Service and Administrators' Pensions Act, 1951 (after 1958)
71	Diplomatic Privileges Act, 1951
72	Stock Exchanges Control Amendment Act, 1951
73	Insurance (Amendment) Act, 1951

== 1952 ==
Act no.	Short title
1	State Lands Disposal Amendment Act, 1952
2	University of the Witwatersrand, Johannesburg, (Private) Act Amendment Act, 1952
3	Radio Act, 1952
4	Financial Relations Amendment Act, 1952
5	Public Holidays Act, 1952
6	Southern Suburbs of Cape Town Water Supply Act Amendment (Private) Act, 1952
7	The Durban Waterworks Additional Borrowing Powers (Private) Act, 1952
8	Defence Special Equipment Account Act, 1952
9	Part Appropriation Act, 1952
10	Land Bank Amendment Act, 1952
11	Coinage Amendment Act, 1952
12	Additional Appropriation Act, 1952
13	Unauthorized Expenditure (1950–1951) Act, 1952
14	Railway Construction Act, 1952
15	Railways and Harbours Part Appropriation Act, 1952
16	Railways and Harbours Additional Appropriation Act, 1952
17	Railways and Harbours Unauthorized Expenditure Act, 1952
18	Atomic Energy Amendment Act, 1952
19	Precious Stones Amendment Act, 1952
20	Fishing Industry Development Amendment Act, 1952
21	Expropriation Amendment Act, 1952
22	Land Settlement Amendment Act, 1952
23	Cape Masters and Servants Act Amendment Act, 1952
24	Prevention of Illegal Squatting Amendment Act, 1952
25	Higher Education Amendment Act, 1952
26	Public Service Amendment Act, 1952
27	Motor Vehicle Insurance Amendment Act, 1952
28	Advertising on Roads and Ribbon Development Amendment Act, 1952
29	Standards Amendment Act, 1952
30	Post Mortem Examinations and Removal of Human Tissues Act, 1952
31	War Measures Continuation Act, 1952
32	General Law Amendment Act, 1952
33	Criminal Sentences Amendment Act, 1952
34	Broadcasting Amendment Act, 1952
35	High Court of Parliament Act, 1952
36	South African Tourist Corporation Amendment Act, 1952
37	Patents Act, 1952
38	International Sanitary Regulations Act, 1952
39	Merchandise Marks Amendment Act, 1952
40	Magistrates' Courts Amendment Act, 1952
41	Precious and Base Metals Amendment Act, 1952
42	Presumption of Death of Soldiers Act, 1952
43	Judges' Salaries and Pensions Amendment Act, 1952
44	Public Health Amendment Act, 1952
45	Railways and Harbours Acts Amendment Act, 1952
46	Companies Amendment Act, 1952
47	Wines, Spirits and Vinegar Amendment Act, 1952
48	Unemployment Insurance Amendment Act, 1952
49	Pension Laws Amendment Act, 1952
50	Finance Act, 1952
51	Stamp Duties Amendment Act, 1952
52	Customs Amendment Act, 1952
53	Excise Amendment Act, 1952
54	Native Laws Amendment Act, 1952 (before 1964); Bantu Laws Amendment Act, 1952 (from 1964 to 1978); Black Laws Amendment Act, 1952 (after 1978)
55	Electoral Laws Amendment Act, 1952
56	Income Tax Act, 1952
57	Pensions (Supplementary) Act, 1952
58	Appropriation Act, 1952
59	Railways and Harbours Appropriation Act, 1952
60	Wool Profits Distribution and Wool Amendment Act, 1952
61	Conversion of Leasehold to Freehold Act, 1952
62	Defence Amendment Act, 1952
63	Silicosis Amendment Act, 1952
64	Native Services Levy Act, 1952 (before 1964); Bantu Services Levy Act, 1952 (from 1964 to 1978); Black Services Levy Act, 1952 (after 1978)
65	Group Areas Amendment Act, 1952
66	Electricity Amendment Act, 1952
67	Natives (Abolition of Passes and Co-ordination of Documents) Act, 1952 (before 1964); Bantu (Abolition of Passes and Co-ordination of Documents) Act, 1952 (from 1964 to 1978); Blacks (Abolition of Passes and Co-ordination of Documents) Act, 1952 (after 1978)

== 1953 ==
Act no.	Short title
1	Part Appropriation Act, 1953
2	Lichtenburg Waterworks (Private) Act, 1953
3	Public Safety Act, 1953
4	Herbert Ainsworth Settlers Trust Private Act, Amendment (Private) Act, 1953
5	Railways and Harbours Part Appropriation Act, 1953
6	Royal Style and Titles Act, 1953
7	Wills Act, 1953
8	Criminal Law Amendment Act, 1953
9	Additional Appropriation Act, 1953
10	Members of Parliament Act, 1953
11	Railways and Harbours Additional Appropriation Act, 1953
12	Second Part Appropriation Act, 1953
13	Land Bank Amendment Act, 1953
14	Second Railways and Harbours Part Appropriation Act, 1953
15	Deeds Registries Amendment Act, 1953
16	Rock Lobster Export Amendment Act, 1953
17	Police (Amendment) Act, 1953
18	Prisons and Reformatories Amendment Act, 1953
19	Unauthorized Expenditure (1951–1952) Act, 1953
20	Criminal Sentences Amendment Act, 1953
21	Justices of the Peace and Oaths Amendment Act, 1953
22	Archives Act, 1953
23	University Laws Amendment Act, 1953
24	Railways and Harbours Unauthorized Expenditure Act, 1953
25	Railways and Harbours Appropriation Act, 1953
26	Entertainments (Censorship) Amendment Act, 1953
27	Fuel Research Institute and Coal Amendment Act, 1953
28	Patents Amendment Act, 1953
29	Sea Fisheries Amendment Act, 1953
30	War Measures Amendment Act, 1953
31	Transfer Duty Amendment Act, 1953
32	Stamp Duties Amendment Act, 1953
33	Appropriation Act, 1953
34	Income Tax Act, 1953
35	Excise Amendment Act, 1953
36	Customs Amendment Act, 1953
37	Matrimonial Affairs Act, 1953
38	Native Building Workers Amendment Act, 1953 (before 1964); Bantu Building Workers Amendment Act, 1953 (from 1964 to 1978); Black Building Workers Amendment Act, 1953 (after 1978)
39	Railway Construction Act, 1953
40	Railways and Harbours Acts Amendment Act, 1953
41	Railways and Harbours Special Pensions Act, 1953
42	Financial Relations Amendment Act, 1953
43	Immigrants Regulation Amendment Act, 1953
44	Pension Laws Amendment Act, 1953
45	Finance Act, 1953
46	Pensions (Supplementary) Act, 1953
47	Bantu Education Act, 1953 (before 1978); Black Education Act, 1953 (after 1978)
48	Native Labour (Settlement of Disputes) Act, 1953 (before 1964); Bantu Labour (Settlement of Disputes) Act, 1953 (from 1964 to 1973); Bantu Labour Relations Regulation Act, 1953 (from 1973 to 1978); Black Labour Relations Regulation Act, 1953 (after 1978)
49	Reservation of Separate Amenities Act, 1953

== 1954 ==
Act no.	Short title
1	Part Appropriation Act, 1954
2	Unauthorized Expenditure (1952–1953) Act, 1954
3	South African National Life Assurance Company Incorporation (Private) Act, 1954
4	Exchequer and Audit Amendment Act, 1954
5	Additional Appropriation Act, 1954
6	Railways and Harbours Unauthorized Expenditure Act, 1954
7	Railways and Harbours Additional Appropriation Act, 1954
8	Dental Mechanicians Amendment Act, 1954
9	Provincial Councils Continuance Act, 1954
10	Unemployment Insurance Amendment Act, 1954
11	Railways and Harbours Appropriation Act, 1954
12	Liquor Law Amendment Act, 1954
13	Native High Court Abolition Act, 1954 (before 1964); Bantu High Court Abolition Act, 1954 (from 1964 to 1978); Black High Court Abolition Act, 1954 (after 1978)
14	Magistrates' Courts Amendment Act, 1954
15	Riotous Assemblies and Suppression of Communism Amendment Act, 1954
16	Public Service Amendment Act, 1954
17	Milnerton Railway (Junction Alteration) Act, 1954
18	Native Trust and Land Amendment Act, 1954 (before 1964); Bantu Trust and Land Amendment Act, 1954 (from 1964 to 1978); Development Trust and Land Amendment Act, 1954 (after 1978)
19	Natives Resettlement Act, 1954 (before 1964); Bantu Resettlement Act, 1954 (from 1964 to 1978); Blacks Resettlement Act, 1954 (after 1978)
20	South Africa Act Amendment Act, 1954
21	Criminal Procedure and Jurors Amendment Act, 1954
22	Wine and Spirits Control Amendment Act, 1954
23	Artificial Insemination of Animals Act, 1954
24	Transvaal Gold Law Amendment Act, 1954
25	Marriage Officers Amendment Act, 1954
26	Electricity Amendment Act, 1954
27	Standards Amendment Act, 1954
28	Explosives Amendment Act, 1954
29	Medical, Dental and Pharmacy Amendment Act, 1954
30	Perishable Products Export Control Amendment Act, 1954
31	Land Bank Amendment Act, 1954
32	Transfer Duty Amendment Act, 1954
33	Death Duties Amendment Act, 1954
34	Finance Act, 1954
35	Excise Amendment Act, 1954
36	Representation of Natives Amendment Act, 1954
37	Mooi River River District Adjustment Act, 1954
38	Liquor Law Further Amendment Act, 1954
39	Boxing and Wrestling Control Act, 1954
40	Land Settlement Amendment Act, 1954
41	Riet River Settlement (Limitation of Irrigable Land) Act, 1954
42	Mapochsgronde Irrigation Scheme Act, 1954
43	Defence Amendment Act, 1954
44	Bantu Education Amendment Act, 1954 (before 1978); Black Education Amendment Act, 1954 (after 1978)
45	Financial Relations Amendment Act, 1954
46	Hire-Purchase Amendment Act, 1954
47	Merchandise Marks Amendment Act, 1954
48	State-aided Institutions Amendment Act, 1954
49	Disability Grants Amendment Act, 1954
50	Royal Seals Amendment Act, 1954
51	War Measures Continuation Act, 1954
52	Pension Laws Amendment Act, 1954
53	Pensions (Supplementary) Act, 1954
54	Customs Amendment Act, 1954
55	Income Tax Act, 1954
56	South-West Africa Native Affairs Administration Act, 1954
57	Appropriation Act, 1954

== 1955 ==
Act no.	Short title
1	Railways and Harbours Additional Appropriation Act, 1955
2	Railway Construction Act, 1955
3	Unauthorized Expenditure (1953–1954) Act, 1955
4	Part Appropriation Act, 1955
5	Additional Appropriation Act, 1955
6	Group Areas Amendment Act, 1955
7	Exchequer and Audit Amendment Act, 1955
8	National Parks Amendment Act, 1955
9	South Africa Act Amendment Act, 1955
10	State Attorney Amendment Act, 1955
11	Prisons and Reformatories Amendment Act, 1955
12	Railways and Harbours Unauthorized Expenditure Act, 1955
13	Native Administration Amendment Act, 1955 (before 1964); Bantu Administration Amendment Act, 1955 (from 1964 to 1978); Black Administration Amendment Act, 1955 (after 1978)
14	Railways and Harbours Appropriation Act, 1955
15	Police Amendment Act, 1955
16	Natives (Urban Areas) Amendment Act, 1955 (before 1964); Bantu (Urban Areas) Amendment Act, 1955 (from 1964 to 1978); Blacks (Urban Areas) Amendment Act, 1955 (after 1978)
17	Sugar Amendment Act, 1955
18	Mine Trading Amendment Act, 1955
19	Orange Free State Metals Mining Amendment Act, 1955
20	Natal Mines Amendment Act, 1955
21	Reserved Minerals Development Amendment Act, 1955
22	Base Minerals Amendment Act, 1955
23	Second-hand Goods Act, 1955
24	Regulation of Monopolistic Conditions Act, 1955
25	Customs Amendment Act, 1955
26	South-West Africa Constitution Amendment Act, 1955
27	Appellate Division Quorum Act, 1955
28	Building Societies Amendment Act, 1955
29	Criminal Procedure and Evidence Amendment Act, 1955
30	Natural Resources Development Amendment Act, 1955
31	Land Settlement Amendment Act, 1955
32	Fishing Industry Development Amendment Act, 1955
33	Diamond Cutting Act, 1955
34	Departure from the Union Regulation Act, 1955
35	Coloured Mission Stations and Reserves Amendment Act, 1955
36	Railways and Harbours Special Pensions Act, 1955
37	Railway Expropriation Act, 1955
38	Excise Amendment Act, 1955
39	National Finance Corporation Amendment Act, 1955
40	Banking Amendment Act, 1955
41	Pension Laws Amendment Act, 1955
42	Customs Further Amendment Act, 1955
43	Income Tax Act, 1955
44	Motor Carrier Transportation Amendment Act, 1955
45	Estate Duty Act, 1955
46	Births, Marriages and Deaths Registration Amendment Act, 1955
47	Second Railway Construction Act, 1955
48	Railways and Harbours Second Additional Appropriation Act, 1955
49	Railways and Harbours Acts Amendment Act, 1955
50	Railways and Harbours Service and Superannuation Amendment Act, 1955
51	Aviation Amendment Act, 1955
52	Expropriation (Establishment of Undertakings) Amendment Act, 1955
53	Senate Act, 1955
54	University of South Africa Amendment Act, 1955
55	Customs Act, 1955
56	Criminal Procedure Act, 1955
57	Wool Amendment Act, 1955
58	Government Service Pensions Act, 1955
59	Native Labour (Settlement of Disputes) Amendment Act, 1955 (before 1964); Bantu Labour (Settlement of Disputes) Amendment Act, 1955 (from 1964 to 1978); Black Labour (Settlement of Disputes) Amendment Act, 1955 (after 1978)
60	Native Building Workers Amendment Act, 1955 (before 1964); Bantu Building Workers Amendment Act, 1955 (from 1964 to 1978); Black Building Workers Amendment Act, 1955 (after 1978)
61	Universities Act, 1955
62	General Law Amendment Act, 1955
63	Nursing Council and Board Continuation Act, 1955
64	Appropriation Act, 1955
65	Electrical Wiremen and Contractors Amendment Act, 1955
66	Pensions (Supplementary) Act, 1955
67	Finance Act, 1955
68	Group Areas Further Amendment Act, 1955
69	Group Areas Development Act, 1955 (before 1965); Community Development Act, 1955 (after 1965)
70	Vocational Education Act, 1955

== 1956 ==
Act no.	Short title
1	Labour Colonies Amendment Act, 1956
2	Arms and Ammunition Amendment Act, 1956
3	Vexations Proceedings Act, 1956
4	Slaughter of Animals Amendment Act, 1956
5	Precious Stones Amendment Act, 1956
6	Coloured People in Towns and Villages Amendment Act, 1956
7	Railways and Harbours Additional Appropriation Act, 1956
8	Part Appropriation Act, 1956
9	South Africa Act Amendment Act, 1956
10	Official Languages (Local Authorities) Amendment Act, 1956
11	Atomic Energy Amendment Act, 1956
12	Unauthorized Expenditure (1954–1955) Act, 1956
13	Animal Diseases and Parasites Act, 1956
14	Railways and Harbours Unauthorized Expenditure Act, 1956
15	Railways and Harbours Acts Amendment Act, 1956
16	Official Secrets Act, 1956
17	Riotous Assemblies Act, 1956
18	Legal Practitioners' Amendment Act, 1956
19	Additional Appropriation Act, 1956
20	Railways and Harbours Appropriation Act, 1956
21	Land Settlement Act, 1956
22	Railways and Harbours Pensions Amendment Act, 1956
23	Exchequer and Audit Act, 1956
24	Pension Funds Act, 1956
25	Friendly Societies Act, 1956
26	Explosives Act, 1956
27	Mines and Works Act, 1956
28	Industrial Conciliation Act, 1956 (before 1981); Labour Relations Act, 1956 (after 1981)
29	Group Areas Amendment Act, 1956
30	Separate Representation of Voters Amendment Act, 1956
31	Irrigation Districts Adjustment Act, 1956
32	Roodepoort Agricultural Settlement Amendment Act, 1956
33	Weltevreden Agricultural Settlement Amendment Act, 1956
34	Apportionment of Damages Act, 1956
35	Liquor Amendment Act, 1956
36	Bantu Education Amendment Act, 1956 (before 1978); Black Education Amendment Act, 1956 (after 1978)
37	Livestock and Produce Sales Act, 1956
38	Wine and Spirits Control Act, 1956
39	Railways and Harbours Acts Further Amendment Act, 1956
40	Workmen's Wages Protection Act, 1956
41	Excise Amendment Act, 1956
42	Native Administration Amendment Act, 1956 (before 1964); Bantu Administration Amendment Act, 1956 (from 1964 to 1978); Black Administration Amendment Act, 1956 (after 1978)
43	Railway Construction Act, 1956
44	Judges' Widows Pensions Act, 1956
45	South African Reserve Bank Amendment Act, 1956
46	Great Fish River Irrigation District Adjustment Act, 1956
47	Public Accountants' and Auditors' Amendment Act, 1956
48	Diamond Export Duty Amendment Act, 1956
49	Licences Amendment Act, 1956
50	General Law Amendment Act, 1956
51	Workmen's Compensation Amendment Act, 1956
52	Immigration Amendment Act, 1956
53	Customs Amendment Act, 1956
54	Water Act, 1956
55	Income Tax Act, 1956
56	Pension Laws Amendment Act, 1956
57	Pneumoconiosis Act, 1956
58	War Measures Continuation Act, 1956
59	Finance Act, 1956
60	Public Health Amendment Act, 1956
61	Liquor Further Amendment Act, 1956
62	Excise Act, 1956
63	Standards (Transfer of Administration) Act, 1956
64	Natives (Prohibition of Interdicts) Act, 1956 (before 1964); Bantu (Prohibition of Interdicts) Act, 1956 (from 1964 to 1978); Blacks (Prohibition of Interdicts) Act, 1956 (after 1978)
65	Appropriation Act, 1956
66	Canned Fruit and Vegetables Export Control Act, 1956
67	Pensions (Supplementary) Act, 1956
68	Parliamentary Service Pensions Amendment Act, 1956
69	Natives (Urban Areas) Amendment Act, 1956 (before 1964); Bantu (Urban Areas) Amendment Act, 1956 (from 1964 to 1978); Blacks (Urban Areas) Amendment Act, 1956 (after 1978)
70	Financial Relations Amendment Act, 1956
71	Population Registration Amendment Act, 1956
72	Simonstown Naval Base Employees' Transfer Act, 1956
73	Native Trust and Land Amendment Act, 1956 (before 1964); Bantu Trust and Land Amendment Act, 1956 (from 1964 to 1978); Development Trust and Land Amendment Act, 1956 (after 1978)

== 1957 ==
Act no.	Short title
1	South Africa Act Further Amendment Act, 1957
2	South Africa Act Amendment Act, 1957
3	Witchcraft Suppression Act, 1957
4	Prisons and Reformatories Amendment Act, 1957
5	Wage Act, 1957
6	Unauthorized Expenditure (1955–1956) Act, 1957
7	Part Appropriation Act, 1957
8	Electoral Laws Further Amendment Act, 1957
9	Unemployment Insurance Amendment Act, 1957
10	Housing Act, 1957
11	Medical, Dental and Pharmacy Amendment Act, 1957
12	Railways and Harbours Additional Appropriation Act, 1957
13	Railways and Harbours Unauthorized Expenditure Act, 1957
14	Hire-Purchase Amendment Act, 1957
15	Additional Appropriation Act, 1957
16	Diamond Export Duty Act, 1957
17	Trustee Investment in Union Government Securities Act, 1957
18	Flags Amendment Act, 1957
19	Special Justices of the Peace Act, 1957
20	State Liability Act, 1957
21	Railways and Harbours Appropriation Act, 1957
22	National Parks and Native Trust Lands Amendment Act, 1957
23	Immorality Act, 1957 (before 1988); Sexual Offences Act, 1957 (after 1988)
24	Official Languages (Local Authorities) Amendment Act, 1957
25	Wine, Spirits and Vinegar Act, 1957 (before 1968); Wine, Other Fermented Beverages and Spirits Act, 1957 (after 1968)
26	Artificial Insemination of Animals Amendment Act, 1957
27	Fruit Export Act, 1957
28	Registration of Pedigree Livestock Act, 1957
29	Simon's Bay Dockyard Port Regulations Amendment Act, 1957
30	University of Pretoria (Private) Act Amendment (Private) Act, 1957
31	State Attorney Amendment Act, 1957
32	Police Amendment Act, 1957
33	Interpretation Act, 1957
34	Railways and Harbours Acts Amendment Act, 1957
35	Electrical Wiremen and Contractors Amendment Act, 1957
36	Native Laws Amendment Act, 1957 (before 1964); Bantu Laws Amendment Act, 1957 (from 1964 to 1978); Black Laws Amendment Act, 1957 (after 1978)
37	Mental Disorders Amendment Act, 1957
38	Financial Relations Amendment Act, 1957
39	Transvaal Gold Law Amendment Act, 1957
40	Natal Mines Amendment Act, 1957
41	Cape Town Foreshore Amendment Act, 1957
42	Agricultural Pests Act, 1957
43	Deeds Registries Amendment Act, 1957
44	Defence Act, 1957
45	Hartebeestpoort Irrigation Scheme (Crocodile River) Amendment Act, 1957
46	State-aided Institutions Amendment Act, 1957
47	Wine and Spirits Control Amendment Act, 1957
48	Merchant Shipping (Certificates of Competency) Amendment Act, 1957
49	Railway Construction Act, 1957
50	Perishable Products Export Control Amendment Act, 1957
51	National Roads and Transport (Co-ordination) Amendment Act, 1957
52	Motor Carrier Transportation Amendment Act, 1957
53	Native Transport Services Act, 1957 (before 1964); Bantu Transport Services Act, 1957 (from 1964 to 1978); Black Transport Services Act, 1957 (after 1978)
54	Public Service Act, 1957
55	South-West Africa Constitution Amendment Act, 1957
56	State Attorney Act, 1957
57	Group Areas Amendment Act, 1957
58	Liquor Amendment Act, 1957
59	Estate Duty Amendment Act, 1957
60	Land Bank Amendment Act, 1957
61	Income Tax Act, 1957
62	Pension Laws Amendment Act, 1957
63	Dairy Industry Act, 1957
64	Public Accountants' and Auditors' Amendment Act, 1957
65	Customs Amendment Act, 1957
66	Parliamentary Service Pensions Amendment Act, 1957
67	Excise Amendment Act, 1957
68	General Law Amendment Act, 1957
69	Nursing Act, 1957
70	Railways and Harbours Control and Management (Consolidation) Act, 1957
71	Railways and Harbours Second Additional Appropriation Act, 1957
72	Vocational Education Amendment Act, 1957
73	Statistics Act, 1957
74	Financial Relations Further Amendment Act, 1957
75	Water Amendment Act, 1957
76	Census Act, 1957
77	Group Areas Act, 1957
78	Export Credit Re-insurance Act, 1957 (before 1981); Export Credit and Foreign Investments Re-insurance Act, 1957 (from 1981 to 2001); Export Credit and Foreign Investments Insurance Act, 1957 (after 2001)
79	Native Laws Further Amendment Act, 1957 (before 1964); Bantu Laws Further Amendment Act, 1957 (from 1964 to 1978); Black Laws Further Amendment Act, 1957 (after 1978)
80	Pensions (Supplementary) Act, 1957
81	Finance Act, 1957
82	Appropriation Act, 1957
83	Canned Fruit and Vegetables Export Control Amendment Act, 1957

== 1958 ==
Act no.	Short title
1	South Africa Act Amendment Act, 1958
2	Separate Representation of Voters Amendment Act, 1958
3	Railway Construction Act, 1958
4	Railways and Harbours Control and Management Amendment Act, 1958
5	Customs Amendment Act, 1958
6	Prevention of Corruption Act, 1958
7	Police Act, 1958
8	Part Appropriation Act, 1958
9	Criminal Procedure Amendment Act, 1958
10	Railways and Harbours Additional Appropriation Act, 1958
11	Railways and Harbours Part Appropriation Act, 1958
12	United Municipal Executive (Pensions) Act, 1958
13	Weights and Measures Act, 1958
14	Regulation of Monopolistic Conditions Amendment Act, 1958
15	Pensions (Supplementary) Act, 1958
16	Unauthorized Expenditure (1956–1957) Act, 1958
17	Additional Appropriation Act, 1958
18	Special Criminal Courts Amendment Act, 1958
19	Judges' Salaries and Pensions Amendment Act, 1958
20	Railways and Harbours Unauthorized Expenditure Act, 1958
21	Railways and Harbours Appropriation Act, 1958
22	Adulterated Leather Act, 1958
23	University of South Africa Amendment Act, 1958
24	Housing Amendment Act, 1958
25	Vocational Education Amendment Act, 1958
26	Sugar Amendment Act, 1958
27	Atomic Energy Amendment Act, 1958
28	Canned Fruit and Vegetables Export Control Amendment Act, 1958
29	Concordia Communal Reserve (Extension of Area) Act, 1958
30	Electoral Law Amendment Act, 1958
31	Expropriation Amendment Act, 1958
32	Labour Colonies (Cape) Amendment Act, 1958
33	Railway Construction Amendment Act, 1958
34	Customs Further Amendment Act, 1958
35	Excise Amendment Act, 1958
36	Income Tax Act, 1958
37	Finance Act, 1958
38	Natives Taxation and Development Amendment Act, 1958 (before 1964); Bantu Taxation and Development Amendment Act, 1958 (after 1964)
39	Appropriation Act, 1958
40	Electricity Act, 1958
41	Native Trust and Land Amendment Act, 1958 (before 1964); Bantu Trust and Land Amendment Act, 1958 (from 1964 to 1978); Development Trust and Land Amendment Act, 1958 (after 1978)
42	National Parks Amendment Act, 1958
43	Police Amendment Act, 1958
44	Post Office Act, 1958 (before 2012); Post and Telecommunication-related Matters Act, 1958 (after 2012)
45	Wine and Spirits Control Amendment Act, 1958
46	Parliamentary Service and Administrators' Pensions Amendment Act, 1958
47	Second Pensions (Supplementary) Act, 1958
48	Wills Amendment Act, 1958
49	South Africa Act Further Amendment Act, 1958

== 1959 ==
Act no.	Short title
1	Appellate Division Quorum Act, 1959
2	"Stem van Suid-Afrika" Copyright Act, 1959
3	South Africa Act Amendment Act, 1959
4	Part Appropriation Act, 1959
5	Unauthorized Expenditure (1957–1958) Act, 1959
6	Trespass Act, 1959
7	Interpretation Amendment Act, 1959
8	Prisons Act, 1959 (before 1991); Correctional Services Act, 1959 (after 1991)
9	Agricultural Products Grading Act, 1959
10	Agricultural Produce Export Act, 1959
11	Agricultural Industries Advancement Act, 1959
12	Wool Amendment Act, 1959
13	Land Settlement Amendment Act, 1959
14	University of Stellenbosch Act, 1916, Amendment (Private) Act, 1959
15	University of the Witwatersrand, Johannesburg, (Private) Act, 1959
16	Criminal Law Amendment Act, 1959
17	Cape Town Foreshore Amendment Act, 1959
18	Wild Birds Export Prohibition Act, 1959
19	University of South Africa Act, 1959
20	Anatomy Act, 1959
21	Railways and Harbours Appropriation Act, 1959
22	Railways and Harbours Unauthorized Expenditure Act, 1959
23	Railways and Harbours Additional Appropriation Act, 1959
24	Additional Appropriation Act, 1959
25	Rating of Railway Property Act, 1959
26	Births, Marriages and Deaths Registration Amendment Act, 1959
27	Klipfontein Organic Products Corporation Amendment Act, 1959
28	Financial Relations Amendment Act, 1959
29	Apprenticeship Amendment Act, 1959
30	Merchant Shipping Amendment Act, 1959
31	Motor Vehicle Insurance Amendment Act, 1959
32	Coloured Mission Stations and Reserves Amendment Act, 1959
33	Bantu Education Amendment Act, 1959 (before 1978); Black Education Amendment Act, 1959 (after 1978)
34	Bantu Investment Corporation Act, 1959
35	Atomic Energy Amendment Act, 1959
36	University of the Orange Free State (Private) Act Amendment Act, 1959
37	University of Stellenbosch Act, 1959
38	University of Cape Town Act, 1959
39	War Measures Continuation Amendment Act, 1959
40	Banking Amendment Act, 1959
41	Industrial Conciliation Amendment Act, 1959
42	Motor Carrier Transportation Amendment Act, 1959
43	Railways and Harbours Second Additional Appropriation Act, 1959
44	Railways and Harbours Acts Amendment Act, 1959
45	Extension of University Education Act, 1959
46	Promotion of Bantu Self-government Act, 1959 (before 1978); Promotion of Black Self-government Act, 1959 (from 1978 to 1987); Representation between the Republic of South Africa and Self-governing Territories Act, 1959 (after 1987)
47	Land Bank Amendment Act, 1959
48	South Africa Act Further Amendment Act, 1959
49	Offices of Profit Amendment Act, 1959
50	Hire-Purchase Amendment Act, 1959
51	Mines and Works Amendment Act, 1959
52	Stamp Duties and Fees Amendment Act, 1959
53	Railway Construction Act, 1959
54	Suid-Afrikaanse Akademie vir Wetenskap en Kuns Act, 1959
55	Native Affairs Act, 1959 (before 1964); Bantu Affairs Act, 1959 (from 1964 to 1978); Black Affairs Act, 1959 (after 1978)
56	Native Building Workers Amendment Act, 1959 (before 1964); Bantu Building Workers Amendment Act, 1959 (from 1964 to 1978); Black Building Workers Amendment Act, 1959 (after 1978)
57	Stock Theft Act, 1959
58	Inquests Act, 1959
59	Supreme Court Act, 1959
60	Sea-shore Amendment Act, 1959
61	Decimal Coinage Act, 1959
62	Farmers' Assistance Act Amendment Act, 1959
63	Customs Amendment Act, 1959
64	University College of Fort Hare Transfer Act, 1959
65	Customs Further Amendment Act, 1959
66	Excise Amendment Act, 1959
67	Pension Laws Amendment Act, 1959
68	Pensions (Supplementary) Act, 1959
69	Canned Fruit and Vegetables Export Control Amendment Act, 1959
70	Artificial Insemination of Animals Amendment Act, 1959
71	Public Health Amendment Act, 1959
72	Housing Amendment Act, 1959
73	Judges' Salaries and Pensions Act, 1959 (before 1966); Judges' Remuneration and Pensions Act, 1959 (after 1966)
74	Legal Practitioners' Fidelity Fund Amendment Act, 1959
75	Criminal Law Further Amendment Act, 1959
76	Unemployment Insurance Amendment Act, 1959
77	Appropriation Act, 1959
78	Income Tax Act, 1959
79	Insurance Amendment Act, 1959
80	Finance Act, 1959
81	Group Areas Development Amendment Act, 1959
82	Universities Amendment Act, 1959
