= List of acts of the Parliament of South Africa, 1930–1939 =

This is a list of acts of the Parliament of South Africa enacted in the years 1930 to 1939.

South African acts are uniquely identified by the year of passage and an act number within that year. Some acts have gone by more than one short title in the course of their existence; in such cases each title is listed with the years in which it applied.

== 1930 ==
Act no.	Short title
1	Additional Appropriation (1929–1930) Act, 1930
2	Co-operative Societies (Further Amendment) Act, 1930
3	Coloured Persons Settlement Areas (Cape) Act, 1930
4	Public Auctions and Transactions in Livestock and Produce (Amendment) Act, 1930
5	Diseases of Stock (Amendment) Act, 1930
6	Agricultural Products Packing and Marking Act, 1930
7	Milnerton Railway (Junction Alteration) Act, 1930
8	Immigration Quota Act, 1930
9	South West Africa Railways and Harbours (Amendment) Act, 1930
10	Wheat Importation Restriction Act, 1930
11	University of South Africa (Amendment) Act, 1930
12	Railways and Harbours Additional Appropriation (1929–1930) Act, 1930
13	University of Pretoria (Private) Act, 1930
14	Appropriation (Part) Act, 1930
15	Railways and Harbours Unauthorized Expenditure (1928–1929) Act, 1930
16	Railways and Harbours Appropriation (Part) Act, 1930
17	Union and Rhodesia Customs Agreements Act, 1930
18	Women's Enfranchisement Act, 1930
19	Riotous Assemblies (Amendment) Act, 1930
20	Colesberg Railway (Suspension of Working) Act, 1930
21	Wage Determinations Validation Act, 1930
22	Apprenticeship (Amendment) Act, 1930
23	Wage Act, 1925, Amendment Act, 1930
24	Industrial Conciliation (Amendment) Act, 1930
25	Natives (Urban Areas) Act, 1923, Amendment Act, 1930 (before 1964); Bantu (Urban Areas) Act, 1923, Amendment Act, 1930 (from 1964 to 1978); Blacks (Urban Areas) Act, 1923, Amendment Act, 1930 (after 1978)
26	Currency and Banking (Further Amendment) Act, 1930
27	Railways and Harbours Service and Superannuation Fund Acts Amendment Act, 1930
28	Forest Act, 1913, Amendment Act, 1930
29	Railways and Harbours Appropriation (1930–1931) Act, 1930
30	Appropriation (1930–1931) Act, 1930
31	Income Tax Act, 1930
32	Customs Tariff (Amendment) Act, 1930
33	Pensions (Supplementary) Act, 1930
34	Financial Adjustments Act, 1930
35	Dairy Industry Control Act, 1930
36	Fuel Research Institute and Coal Act, 1930
37	Wine, Spirits and Vinegar Act, 1913, Act, 1930
38	Miners' Phthisis Acts Further Amendment Act, 1930
39	Motor Carrier Transportation Act, 1930
40	Railways and Harbours Regulation, Control and Management Act, 1916, Further Amendment Act, 1930
41	Irrigation Districts Adjustment Act, 1930
42	Agricultural Warehouse Act, 1930

== 1931 ==
Act no.	Short title
1	Land Settlement (Amendment) Act, 1931
2	Dairy Industry Control (Amendment) Act, 1931
3	Government Industrial Schools Administration Act, 1931
4	Farmers' Special Relief Act, 1931
5	Rand Water Board Statutes, 1903–1923, Amendment (Private) Act, 1931
6	Railways and Harbours Additional Appropriation (1930–1931) Act, 1931
7	Railways and Harbours Unauthorized Expenditure (1929–1930) Act, 1931
8	Justices of the Peace and Oaths (Amendment) Act, 1931
9	Children's Protection (Amendment) Act, 1931
10	Additional Appropriation (1930–1931) Act, 1931
11	Unauthorized Expenditure (1929–1930) Act, 1931
12	Appropriation (Part) Act, 1931
13	Railways and Harbours Appropriation (Part) Act, 1931
14	Flour and Meal Importation Restriction Act, 1931
15	Immigration (Amendment) Act, 1931
16	Rhodes Trust Incorporation (Private) Act, 1931
17	General Estate and Orphan Chamber Act, 1861, Amendment (Private) Act, 1931
18	Rhodesia Appeals Act, 1931
19	Railways and Harbours Service and Superannuation Fund Acts Amendment Act, 1931
20	Female Jurors Act, 1931
21	Railways and Harbours Regulation, Control and Management (Further Amendment) Act, 1931
22	Mines and Works (Amendment) Act, 1931
23	State-aided Institutions Act, 1931
24	Unlawful Determination of Prices Act, 1931
25	Land Settlement Relief Act, 1931
26	Factories (Amendment) Act, 1931
27	Higher Education Financial Provision Act, 1931
28	Entertainments (Censorship) Act, 1931
29	Workmen's Compensation (Amendment) Act, 1931
30	Income Tax Act, 1931
31	Post Office (Amendment) Act, 1931
32	State Property (Immunity from Rating) Act, 1931
33	Pensions (Supplementary) Act, 1931
34	Old Age Pensions (Amendment) Act, 1931
35	Electoral Laws Amendment Act, 1931
36	Native Lands Adjustment Act, 1931 (before 1964); Bantu Lands Adjustment Act, 1931 (from 1964 to 1978); Black Lands Adjustment Act, 1931 (after 1978)
37	Natives Taxation and Development (Amendment) Act, 1931 (before 1964); Bantu Taxation and Development (Amendment) Act, 1931 (after 1964)
38	South-West Africa Constitution Act, 1925, Further Amendment Act, 1931
39	Mealie Control Act, 1931
40	Iron and Steel Industry (Amendment) Act, 1931
41	Franchise Laws Amendment Act, 1931
42	Stamp Duties and Fees (Amendment) Act, 1931
43	Railways and Harbours Construction Act, 1931
44	Customs Tariff (Amendment) Act, 1931
45	Financial Adjustments Act, 1931
46	Appropriation (1931–1932) Act, 1931
47	Railways and Harbours Appropriation (1931–1932) Act, 1931
48	Finance Emergency Regulations Act, 1931
49	Exports Subsidies Act, 1931

== 1932 ==
Act no.	Short title
1	Unauthorized Expenditure (1930–1931) Act, 1932
2	Railways and Harbours Unauthorized Expenditure (1930–1931) Act, 1932
3	Part Appropriation Act, 1932
4	Additional Appropriation Act, 1932
5	Railways and Harbours Part Appropriation Act, 1932
6	Building Societies and Savings Bank Societies Borrowing Powers Act, 1932 (before 1935); Savings Bank Societies Borrowing Powers Act, 1932 (after 1935)
7	Dairy Industry Control (Amendment) Act, 1932
8	Rand Water Board Statutes 1903–1931 Amendment (Private) Act, 1932
9	Diplomatic Immunities Act, 1932
10	Marico-Bosveld Irrigation Scheme Act, 1932
11	Companies Act, 1926, Amendment Act, 1932
12	The Methodist Church of South Africa (Private) Act, 1932
13	Mafeking Waterworks (Private) Act, 1932
14	Nationalization and Amnesty Act, 1932
15	Saint Andrew's College, Grahamstown (Private) Act, 1932
16	Railways and Harbours Superannuation Fund Amendment Act, 1932
17	Magistrates' Courts (Amendment) Act, 1932
18	Notarial Bonds (Natal) Act, 1932
19	Tobacco Control Act, 1932
20	Railways and Harbours Emoluments Temporary Reduction Act, 1932
21	Salaries Reduction Act, 1932
22	Flood Distress Relief Act, 1932
23	Mealie Control (Amendment) Act, 1932
24	Native Service Contract Act, 1932
25	Financial Adjustments Act, 1932
26	Mining Rights (South-West Africa) Act, 1932
27	Customs Tariff (Amendment) Act, 1932
28	Income Tax Act, 1932
29	Meat Trade Control Act, 1932
30	Pensions (Supplementary) Act, 1932
31	Motor Carrier Transportation Amendment Act, 1932
32	Defence Act (Amendment) and Dominion Forces Act, 1932
33	Appropriation Act, 1932
34	Railways and Harbours Appropriation Act, 1932
35	Transvaal Asiatic Land Tenure Act, 1932

== 1933 ==
Act no.	Short title
1	Usury Amendment Act, 1933
2	Fuel Research Institute and Coal Amendment Act, 1933
3	Germiston–Elsburg Railway Construction Act, 1933
4	Customs Surtax Cancellation Act, 1933
5	Potchefstroomse Universiteitskollege vir Christelik Hoër Onderwys (Private) Act, 1933
6	Ohrigstad Settlement Act, 1933
7	Industrial Conciliation (Further Amendment) Act, 1933
8	Ottawa Agreements Act, 1933
9	Currency and Exchanges Act, 1933
10	Railways and Harbours Unauthorized Expenditure Act, 1933
11	Part Appropriation Act, 1933
12	Railways and Harbours Part Appropriation Act, 1933
13	Weights and Measures (Amendment) Act, 1933
14	Railways and Harbours Additional Appropriation Act, 1933
15	Additional Appropriation Act, 1933
16	Veterinary Act, 1933
17	South Africa Act Amendment Act, 1933
18	Agricultural Pests Amendment Act, 1933
19	Immigration (Amendment) Act, 1933
20	Franschhoek Water (Private) Act, 1933
21	Rand Water Board Statutes 1903–1932 Amendment (Private) Act, 1933
22	Union and Southern Rhodesia Death Duties Act, 1933
23	Co-operative Societies (Further Amendment) Act, 1933
24	Pensions (Supplementary) Act, 1933
25	Second Railway Construction Act, 1933
26	Gambling Amendment Act, 1933
27	Provincial Taxation Powers Act, 1933
28	Customs Tariff and Excise Duties (Amendment) Act, 1933
29	Financial Adjustments Act, 1933
30	Appropriation Act, 1933
31	Income Tax Act, 1933
32	Railways and Harbours Appropriation Act, 1933
33	Gold Mines Excess Profits Duty Act, 1933
34	Farm Mortgage Interest Act, 1933

== 1934 ==
Act no.	Short title
1	Additional Appropriation Act, 1934
2	Post Office (Amendment) Act, 1934
3	Anatomy Amendment Act, 1934
4	Natural and Historical Monuments, Relics and Antiques Act, 1934
5	Mines and Works (Amendment) Act, 1934
6	Entertainments Censorship Amendment Act, 1934
7	Births, Marriages and Deaths Registration Amendment Act, 1934
8	Export Subsidies Amendment Act, 1934
9	Part Appropriation Act, 1934
10	Diamond Export Duty (Amendment) Act, 1934
11	Irrigation Districts Adjustment (Amendment) Act, 1934
12	Railways and Harbours Part Appropriation Act, 1934
13	Succession Act, 1934
14	Newspaper and Imprint Act, 1934
15	Agricultural Pests Amendment Act, 1934
16	Second Additional Appropriation Act, 1934
17	Railways and Harbours Additional Appropriation Act, 1934
18	Railways and Harbours Unauthorized Expenditure Act, 1934
19	Diplomatic Immunities Act Amendment Act, 1934
20	Motor Carrier Transportation Amendment Act, 1934
21	Orange Free State Administration of Justice Amendment Act, 1934
22	Wild Birds Protection Act, 1934
23	Attorneys, Notaries and Conveyancers Admission Act, 1934
24	Fencing Amendment Act, 1934
25	Cape Statute Law Revision Act, 1934
26	Slaughter of Animals Act, 1934
27	Reformatories Amendment Act, 1934
28	Eastern Districts Local Division Constitution Act, 1934
29	Higher Education Amendment Act, 1934
30	Judges' Salaries (Amendment) Act, 1934
31	Herbert Ainsworth Settlers Trust Private Act, 1934
32	Railways and Harbours Strike Act, 1934
33	Co-operative Societies (Amendment) Act, 1934
34	Trust Moneys Protection Act, 1934
35	South African Association Further Amendment (Private) Act, 1934
36	Mineral Law Amendment Act, 1934
37	Buffelspoort Irrigation District Adjustments Act, 1934
38	Vaal River Development Scheme Act, 1934
39	Sundays River Irrigation District Adjustments Act, 1934
40	Customs Tariff (Amendment) Act, 1934
41	Liquor Amendment Act, 1934
42	Merchant Shipping (Certificates of Competency) Amendment Act, 1934
43	Gold Mines Excess Profits Duty (Amendment) Act, 1934
44	Income Tax Act, 1934
45	South Africa Act Amendment Act, 1934
46	Irrigation Amendment Act, 1934
47	Legalization of Angola Marriages Act, 1934
48	Livestock and Meat Industries Act, 1934
49	Colonial Stock Act, 1900, Declaration Act, 1934
50	Crawfish Export Control Act, 1934
51	Dairy Industry Control Amendment Act, 1934
52	Jointed Cactus Eradication Act, 1934
53	Slums Act, 1934
54	Abolition of Quitrent Act, 1934
55	Farmers' Special Relief Amendment Act, 1934
56	Public Service Pensions Amendment Act, 1934
57	Land Settlement (Amendment) Act, 1934
58	Land Bank Amendment Act, 1934
59	Workmen's Compensation Act, 1934
60	Miners' Phthisis Amendment Act, 1934
61	Iron and Steel Industry Amendment Act, 1934
62	Building Societies Act, 1934
63	Farm Mortgage Interest (Amendment) Act, 1934
64	Finance Act, 1934
65	Pensions (Supplementary) Act, 1934
66	Appropriation Act, 1934
67	Railways and Harbours Appropriation Act, 1934
68	Housing (Amendment) Act, 1934
69	Status of the Union Act, 1934
70	Royal Executive Functions and Seals Act, 1934

== 1935 ==
Act no.	Short title
1	Additional Appropriation Act, 1935
2	Medical, Dental and Pharmacy Amendment Act, 1935
3	Second Additional Appropriation Act, 1935
4	Unauthorized Expenditure (1933–1934) Act, 1935
5	Census Amendment Act, 1935
6	Higher Education Amendment Act, 1935
7	Aviation Health Act, 1935
8	Marriage Law Amendment Act, 1935
9	Rand Water Board Statutes 1903–1933 Amendment (Private) Act, 1935
10	Railways and Harbours Unauthorized Expenditure Act, 1935
11	Railways and Harbours Additional Appropriation Act, 1935
12	Railways and Harbours Part Appropriation Act, 1935
13	Part Appropriation Act, 1935
14	Union and Southern Rhodesia Trade Agreement Act, 1935
15	John Dunn (Distribution of Land) Act, 1935
16	Wage Determinations Validation Act, 1935
17	Tobacco Control Amendment Act, 1935
18	Trade Coupons Act, 1935
19	Building Societies (Amendment) Act, 1935
20	National Parks Amendment Act, 1935
21	Sea-shore Act, 1935
22	The Malmesbury Board of Executors and Trust and Fire Assurance Company (Amendment) (Private) Act, 1935
23	Protection of Names, Uniforms and Badges Act, 1935
24	Performing Animals Protection Act, 1935
25	Railways and Harbours Gratuity Amendment Act, 1935
26	Prisons and Reformatories Amendment Act, 1935
27	Native Lands Further Release and Acquisition Act, 1935 (before 1964); Bantu Lands Further Release and Acquisition Act, 1935 (from 1964 to 1978); Black Lands Further Release and Acquisition Act, 1935 (after 1978)
28	Income Tax Act, 1935
29	Motor Carrier Transportation Amendment Act, 1935
30	Iron and Steel Industry Amendment Act, 1935
31	Perishable Products Export Control Amendment Act, 1935
32	Divorce Laws Amendment Act, 1935
33	Public Service Amendment Act, 1935
34	Reformatories Service Act, 1935
35	Transvaal Asiatic Land Tenure Amendment Act, 1935
36	Sundays River Settlement Management Act, 1935
37	State Advances Recoveries Act, 1935
38	Kopjes Irrigation Settlement Act, 1935
39	Vyfhoek Management Act, 1935
40	Building Societies (Temporary Registration) Act, 1935
41	Crawfish Export Control Amendment Act, 1935
42	National Roads Act, 1935
43	South Africa Act Amendment Act, 1935
44	Customs Tariff Amendment Act, 1935
45	Railways and Harbours Appropriation Act, 1935
46	General Law Amendment Act, 1935
47	Land Settlement (Amendment) Act, 1935
48	Farmers' Assistance Act, 1935
49	Finance Act, 1935
50	Provincial Subsidies and Taxation Powers Further Amendment Act, 1935
51	Gold Mines Excess Profits Duty Amendment Act, 1935
52	Farm Mortgage Interest (Amendment) Act, 1935
53	Land Bank Amendment Act, 1935
54	Pensions (Supplementary) Act, 1935
55	Wine, Spirits and Vinegar Act, 1913, Amendment Act, 1935
56	Appropriation Act, 1935
57	Public Health Amendment Act, 1935
58	Wheat Industry Control Act, 1935
59	Mealie Control Amendment Act, 1935
60	Dairy Industry Control Amendment Act, 1935

== 1936 ==
Act no.	Short title
1	Vyfhoek Management Act, 1936
2	Additional Appropriation Act, 1936
3	Part Appropriation Act, 1936
4	Unauthorized Expenditure (1934–1935) Act, 1936
5	Railways and Harbours Unauthorized Expenditure Act, 1936
6	Railways and Harbours Additional Appropriation Act, 1936
7	Railways and Harbours Part Appropriation Act, 1936
8	Extradition Act, 1936
9	National Parks Amendment Act, 1936
10	Railway Acquisition and Construction Act, 1936
11	Blind Persons Act, 1936
12	Representation of Natives Act, 1936
13	Orange Free State Metals Mining Act, 1936
14	Motor Carrier Transportation Amendment Act, 1936
15	Deputy-Administrators Act, 1936
16	University of the Witwatersrand, Johannesburg (Private) Act Amendment Act, 1936
17	Girls' and Mentally Defective Women's Protection Act, 1916, Amendment Act, 1936
18	Native Trust and Land Act, 1936 (before 1964); Bantu Trust and Land Act, 1936 (from 1964 to 1978); Development Trust and Land Act, 1936 (after 1978)
19	Gold Law and Mine Trading Amendment Act, 1936
20	Farm Mortgage Interest Act Extension Act, 1936
21	Land Bank Amendment Act, 1936
22	Broadcasting Act, 1936
23	Miners' Phthisis Amendment Act, 1936
24	Insolvency Act, 1936
25	Customs Tariff Amendment Act, 1936
26	Pensions (Supplementary) Act, 1936
27	Railway Pensioners Act, 1936
28	Sugar Act, 1936
29	Union and Rhodesia Agreements (Amendments) Act, 1936
30	Transvaal Asiatic Land Tenure Amendment Act, 1936
31	Housing Amendment Act, 1936
32	Government Service Pensions Act, 1936
33	Orange Free State Statute Law Revision Act, 1936
34	Income Tax Act, 1936
35	Finance Act, 1936
36	Public Service Amendment Act, 1936
37	Railways and Harbours Appropriation Act, 1936
38	Workmen's Compensation Amendment Act, 1936
39	Appropriation Act, 1936

== 1937 ==
Act no.	Short title
1	Aliens Act, 1937
2	His Majesty King Edward the Eighth's Abdication Act, 1937
3	Unauthorized Expenditure (1935–1936) Act, 1937
4	Vaal River Development Scheme (Amendment) Act, 1937
5	Medical, Dental and Pharmacy Amendment Act, 1937
6	Additional Appropriation Act, 1937
7	Coronation Oath Act, 1937
8	Part Appropriation Act, 1937
9	Natural Monuments Amendment Act, 1937
10	Railways and Harbours Additional Appropriation Act, 1937
11	Railways and Harbours Part Appropriation Act, 1937
12	Railways and Harbours Unauthorized Expenditure Act, 1937
13	Railways and Harbours Management Amendment Act, 1937
14	Unlawful Determination of Prices Amendment Act, 1937
15	Motor Carrier Transportation Amendment Act, 1937
16	Uitenhage (Groendal) Water (Private) Act, 1937
17	Cape Outspans Act, 1937
18	Douglas Irrigable Areas Board Act, 1937
19	Mapochs Gronden Amendment Act, 1937
20	The Durban Waterworks (Private) Act, 1937
21	Electoral Quota Act, 1937
22	Land Bank Amendment Act, 1937
23	South African Mutual Life Assurance Society Amendment (Private) Act, 1937
24	Slums (Amendment) Act, 1937
25	Unemployment Benefit Act, 1937
26	Marketing Act, 1937
27	Immigration Amendment Act, 1937
28	Arms and Ammunition Act, 1937
29	Unbeneficial Occupation of Farms Act, 1937
30	Agricultural Schools Transfer Act, 1937
31	Children's Act, 1937
32	Transvaal Asiatic Land Tenure Further Amendment Act, 1937
33	Abolition of Quitrent (Towns and Villages) Act, 1937
34	Old Age Pensions Amendment Act, 1937
35	Railways Construction Act, 1937
36	Industrial Conciliation Act, 1937
37	Diseases of Stock Amendment Act, 1937
38	Precious Stones Amendment Act, 1937
39	Liquor Amendment Act, 1937
40	Namaqualand Copper Mines Income Tax Relief Act, 1937
41	Additional Housing Act, 1937
42	Weeds Act, 1937
43	Special Schools Amendment Act, 1937
44	Wage Act, 1937
45	Land Settlement Amendment Act, 1937
46	Native Laws Amendment Act, 1937 (before 1964); Bantu Laws Amendment Act, 1937 (from 1964 to 1978); Black Laws Amendment Act, 1937 (after 1978)
47	Deeds Registries Act, 1937
48	Mealie Control Amendment Act, 1937
49	Pensions (Supplementary) Act, 1937
50	Finance Act, 1937
51	Income Tax Act, 1937
52	Customs Tariff and Excise Amendment Act, 1937
53	British Kaffrarian Savings Bank Society Proclamation Amendment (Private) Act, 1937
54	Railways and Harbours Appropriation Act, 1937
55	Appropriation Act, 1937
56	Building Societies Amendment Act, 1937
57	Notarial Bonds (Natal) Act, 1932, Amendment Act, 1937

== 1938 ==
Act no.	Short title
1	Additional Appropriation Act, 1938
2	Railways and Harbours Additional Appropriation Act, 1938
3	Unauthorized Expenditure (1936–1937) Act, 1938
4	Railways and Harbours Unauthorized Expenditure Act, 1938
5	Railways and Harbours Part Appropriation Act, 1938
6	Miners' Phthisis Amendment Act, 1938
7	Pensions (Supplementary) Act, 1938
8	Part Appropriation Act, 1938
9	Second Part Appropriation Act, 1938
10	Second Railways and Harbours Part Appropriation Act, 1938
11	Cape of Good Hope Savings Bank Society Further Amendment Act, 1938
12	Rand Water Board Statutes 1903–1935 Amendment (Private) Act, 1938
13	South Africa Act Amendment Act, 1938
14	Public Health Amendment Act, 1938
15	Tourist Development Corporation Act, 1938
16	Attorneys, Notaries and Conveyancers Admission (Amendment) Act, 1938
17	Finance Act, 1938
18	Railways and Harbours Acts Amendment Act, 1938
19	Marketing Amendment Act, 1938
20	Income Tax Act, 1938
21	Second Pensions (Supplementary) Act, 1938
22	Railways and Harbours Appropriation Act, 1938
23	Representation of Natives (Amendment) Act, 1938
24	Land Bank Amendment Act, 1938
25	Appropriation Act, 1938

== 1939 ==
Act no.	Short title
1	Additional Appropriation Act, 1939
2	Weeds Amendment Act, 1939
3	Agricultural Schools Transfer Amendment Act, 1939
4	Agricultural Produce Export Amendment Act, 1939
5	Gambling Amendment Act, 1939
6	Railways and Harbours Unauthorized Expenditure Act, 1939
7	Railways and Harbours Additional Appropriation Act, 1939
8	Railways and Harbours Part Appropriation Act, 1939
9	Native Administration (Amendment) Act, 1939 (before 1964); Bantu Administration (Amendment) Act, 1939 (from 1964 to 1978); Black Administration (Amendment) Act, 1939 (after 1978)
10	Wrestling Regulation Act, 1939
11	Woodcutters Annuities Act, 1939
12	Second Additional Appropriation Act, 1939
13	Unauthorized Expenditure (1937–1938) Act, 1939
14	Justices of the Peace and Oaths (Amendment) Act, 1939
15	Cannon Island Settlement Management Act, 1939
16	Part Appropriation Act, 1939
17	Native Trust and Land Amendment Act, 1939 (before 1964); Bantu Trust and Land Amendment Act, 1939 (from 1964 to 1978); Development Trust and Land Amendment Act, 1939 (after 1978)
18	Children's (Amendment) Act, 1939
19	Police (South-West Africa) Act, 1939
20	Electrical Wiremen and Contractors Act, 1939
21	Higher Education (Amendment) Act, 1939
22	Matrimonial Causes Jurisdiction Act, 1939
23	Companies Amendment Act, 1939
24	Farm Mortgage Interest Amendment Act, 1939
25	Natives Taxation (Amendment) Act, 1939 (before 1964); Bantu Taxation (Amendment) Act, 1939 (after 1964)
26	Aliens Registration Act, 1939
27	Natal Advocates and Attorneys Preservation of Rights Act, 1939
28	Asiatics (Transvaal Land and Trading) Act, 1939
29	Co-operative Societies Act, 1939
30	Police and Prisons Officers Pay Act, 1939
31	Appropriation Act, 1939
32	Cape Statute Law Revision Amendment Act, 1939
33	Finance Act, 1939
34	Railways and Harbours Appropriation Act, 1939
35	Unbeneficial Occupation of Farms Amendment Act, 1939
36	Railways and Harbours Regulation, Control and Management Amendment Act, 1939
37	Railway Construction Act, 1939
38	Income Tax Act, 1939
39	Customs Tariff Amendment Act, 1939
40	Pensions (Supplementary) Act, 1939
41	Shops and Offices Act, 1939
42	Senate Act, 1939
