= A.S. Mopeli-Paulus =

Mosotho writer from South Africa (1913–1994)

Atwell Sidwell Mopeli-Paulus
- Promotional portrait of A.S. Mopeli-Paulus in Basotho blanket and hat, 1953
- Born: 15 January 1913 Monontsha
- Died: 1994 (aged 80–81)
- Occupation: Writer
- Period: 1950-1960
- Notable works: Blanket Boy's Moon (1953); Turn to the Dark (1956); The World and the Cattle (2008)

Atwell Sidwell Mopeli-Paulus (15 January 1913–1994) was a Mosotho writer from South Africa who published works in Sesotho and co-authored works in English. During the 1950s he completed several novels, novellas and the first draft of his autobiography.

He is best known for the novel Blanket Boy's Moon, which was co-authored with Peter Lanham (the pen name of Cecil John Lanham Parker). The book was an international bestseller and widely translated.

== Life and major works ==
Atwell Sidwell Mopeli-Paulus is often incorrectly referred to as a 'Lesotho author' when in fact he was born and spent much of his life in South Africa, in areas confiscated following the Basuto Gun War. He did, however, maintain a strong identification with Lesotho.

The son of Sidwell Mopeli and 'Mathota Mopeli-Paulus, Mopeli-Paulus was born in 1913 in Monontsha in the then Witzieshoek Native Reserve of the Orange Free State (later known as QwaQwa). He was the direct descendent of Moshoeshoe I and would go on to inherit his father's chieftaincy in Witzieshoek.

He was educated at Edendale Teacher's College and the University of the Witwatersrand, before serving in the Second World War in Egypt, Abyssinia and Kenya with the Cape Corps.

Following the war, Mopeli-Paulus moved to Johannesburg and began working at a law firm. While there, he wrote a long poem on the sinking of the SS Mendi in the First World War. This appears to have been lost, apart from a short excerpt that was included in his later novel Blanket Boy Moon.

Mopeli-Pualus' first publication was a small collection of Sesotho poems entitled Ho Tsamaea Ke Ho Bona (To Travel is to Learn) in 1945. These poems reflect on his experiences during the war, his family, and black consciousness.

Five years later he published his first Sesotho novel, Liretlo (Medicine Murder), and a short story Lilahloane wa batho (The Poor Lilahloane). Liretlo deals with the practice of murder for body parts, which are then used to prepare medicine that was believed to strengthen the powers of those who commission the murder. This theme was also explored by Sebolai Matlosa in his play Katiba. Liretlo has often been misunderstood as the original text for the English language Blanket Boy Moon.

During 1949-1950, Mopeli-Paulus was involved in the Witzieshoek Revolt, including a battle at Namoha that left a number of people dead. He fled over the border to Lesotho, but was soon sent to prison. The subject of his imprisonment is included in both Turn to the Dark and The World and the Cattle.

Mopeli-Pualus later returned to QwaQwa, taking up a teaching post and serving on the Legislative Assembly. He published a biography of Moshoeshoe I, Moshweshwe moshwaila, as well as a translation of Macbeth.

=== Blanket Boy's Moon (1953) ===
Blanket Boy’s Moon tells the story of Monare who travels to Johannesburg as a migrant labourer before returning home to Lesotho, where he is implicated in a liretlo murder for body parts. Monare flees, and his guilt leads him to try and help others in need as he makes his way to Mozambique. He then returns to South Africa to save men trapped following a mine collapse, but is eventually caught by the police and extradicted to Lesotho where he is tried and hanged. Marc Epprecht has commented on the story's depiction of homosexuality:

Blanket Boy’s Moon is the first novel by an African to depict homosexuality among black men, and is all the more remarkable for the ambivalent way it treats the topic. It includes the suggestion that male–male sex or intimate physical contact was known in rural settings and thus was not a purely urban, modern phenomenon as often claimed.

The book was an international bestseller and is the most widely read work by a Mosotho writer after the novels of Thomas Mofolo. The first United Kingdom edition had a print run of 47,000 copies alone. In the United States it appeared under the title Blanket Boy and was translated into Dutch (Dekenjongen, 1952), Danish (Sort mands måne, 1953), French (L'homme noir sous la lune, 1953), German (Blut hat mur eine farbe, 1953), Swedish (Svart mans måne, 1953), Hebrew (הירח של מונארה) and later Italian (Fuoco nero, 1960). The book was also serialised in a Swahili periodical. Several paperback editions have subsequently appeared, most recently in 1984 from David Philip Publishers in Cape Town. It was generally well received in both the popular press and academic reviews

The authorship of Mopeli-Paulus' best known work has received considerable attention. While there remain uncertainties, it is likely that Mopeli-Paulus wrote a draft manuscript in English, before sending it to Lanham who had advertised his services as an editor and publisher. Lanham then revised the text, quite considerably it seems, and then published it. The first UK edition describes the result as being by 'Peter Lanham based on an original story by A.S. Mopeli-Paulus'. Mopeli-Paulus sought legal advice from his attorney, Hyman Basner, which resulted in a lump sum payment and assurance that the American edition would be credited to 'Peter Lanham and A.S. Mopeli-Paulus'. Despite this, the ownership of Blanket Boy's Moon was held by Lanham and passed to his heir after he died.

=== Turn to the Dark (1956) ===
Turn to the Dark centres on Lesiba, a young Mosotho man who abandons his mission education and the guidance of his father, a preacher, in favour of a traditional initiation school. Lesiba becomes the protégé of the local chief, who coerces Lesiba to participate in liretlo and who is subsequently arrested.

Like Blanket Boy's Moon before it, Turn to the Dark was a co-authored work. Mopeli-Paulus worked on this occasion with Miriam Basner, the wife of his attorney, first drafting the text before Basner undertook significant revisions.

=== The World and the Cattle (2008) ===
Mopeli-Paulus continued to work with Miriam Basner over subsequent years, completing The World and the Cattle by the mid-1970s. While excerpts of this were included in Drum magazine in 1954-1955, the full text was not published until 14 years after his death.

An autobiographical work, much of The World and the Cattle is an account of Mopeli-Paulus' involvement in the Witzieshoek Revolt and his resulting trial and imprisonment. A such, it has been widely used as a primary scourse to understand the events of 1949-1950 and was well received following its eventual publication.

== Complete works ==
- Mopeli-Paulus, A. S. (1945). Ho Tsamaya Ke Ho Bona (in Southern Sotho). Morija: Sesuto Book Depot.
- —— (1950). Lilahloane wa batho (in Southern Sotho). Bloemfontein: Via Afrika.
- —— (1950). Liretlo (in Southern Sotho). Bloemfontein: Via Afrika.
- Lanham, Peter; Mopeli-Paulus, A. S. (1953). Blanket Boy's Moon. London: Collins.
- Lanham, Peter; Mopeli-Paulus, A. S. (1953). Blanket Boy. New York: Thomas Y. Crowell Co.
- Mopeli-Paulus, A. S.; Basner, Miriam (1956). Turn to the Dark. London: Jonathan Cape.
- Mopeli-Paulus, A. S. (1964). Moshweshwe moshwaila (in Southern Sotho). Johannesburg: Bona Press.
- —— (1985). Moshanyana se llele ho disa (in Southern Sotho). Pretoria: De Jager-Haum.
- —— (1993). Makebete (in Southern Sotho). Midrand: Educum.
- —— (2008). The World and the Cattle. Johannesburg: Penguin.

In addition to his published works, several unpublished texts exist in archives. These include Tongaland, a novel dated 1952 and a short story At the Crossroads written sometime after 1960. In addition, he may have authored Histori ya Kereke ya Zion Christian Church, dated 1972.

== Sources ==
- Abrahams, Peter (1954). "The Conflict of Culture in Africa". International Affairs. 30 (3): 304–312. doi:10.2307/2605750. JSTOR 2605750.
- Aerni-Flessner, John; Fogelman, Charles; Mokoena-Mokhali, Nthabiseng (2023). Historical Dictionary of Lesotho. Rowman & Littlefield Publishers. ISBN 978-1-5381-8769-2.
- Barkham, John (29 March 1953). "Under White Man's Rules". New York Times. ProQuest 112831759.
- Dunton, Chris (1990). "Mopeli-Paulus and "Blanket Boy's Moon"". Research in African Literatures. 21 (4): 105–120. JSTOR 3819324.
- Dunton, Chris (2013). "From Mqhayi to Sole: Four Poems on the Sinking of the Troopship Mendi". In Lindfors, Bernth; Davis, Geoffrey V. (eds.). African Literatures and Beyond. Brill. pp. 135–420. doi:10.1163/9789401209892_010.
- Dunton, Chris (2019). "Dispossession and Repossession in the Published and Unpublished Works of A. S. Mopeli-Paulus". Research in African Literatures. 50: 141–149.
- Dunton, Chris; Masiea, Lerato (2021). "Between Rocks and Hard Places: the Controversial Career of A.S. Mopeli-Paulus". English in Africa. 48: 47–64. doi:10.4314/eia.v48i3.3.
- Felton, Marjorie (1953). "Reviewed Work(s): Blanket Boy by Peter Lanham and A. S. Mopeli-Paulus". The Journal of Negro History. 38: 448–449. JSTOR 2715898.
- Gérard, Albert S (1971). Four African literatures: Xhosa, Sotho, Zulu, Amharic. Berkeley: University of California Press.
- Gerstner, David A. (2006). Routledge International Encyclopedia of Queer Culture. Abingdon: Routledge.
- Isaacson, Maureen (29 June 2008). "Lesotho to El Alamein, to prison and, at last, into print: Dispatches". Independent Online (South Africa). ProQuest 431141119.
- J.G.W. (1953). "Reviewed Work(s): Blanket Boy's Moon by Peter Lanham and A. S. Mopeli-Paulus". African Affairs. 52: 258–259. JSTOR 718487.
- Jones, Hannah (1995). "A Co-Authored 'Curio' from the 'Dark Continent': A. S. Mopeli-Paulus and Peter Lanham's Blanket Boy's Moon". Journal of Southern African Studies. 21 (4): 601–612. JSTOR 2637211.
- Maahlamela, Tebogo David (2017). Sepedi oral poetry with reference to kiba traditional dance of South Africa (PDF) (PhD thesis). Rhodes University.
- Maphike, Pule Ranaileng Stephen (1991). History of southern sotho literature as system, 1930-1960 (PhD thesis). University of South Africa.
- Prescott, Orville (7 April 1953). "Books of the Times". New York Times. ProQuest 112879282.
