= Birdhaven, Gauteng =

Birdhaven
- Location within Gauteng Location within South Africa
- Coordinates: 26°08′23″S 28°03′18″E
- Country: South Africa
- Province: Gauteng
- Municipality: City of Johannesburg
- Main Place: Johannesburg
- Established: 1949

Area
  - Total: 1.08 km^{2} (0.42 sq mi)

Population (2011)
  - Total: 984
  - Density: 911/km^{2} (2,360/sq mi)

Racial makeup (2011)
  - Black African: 29.9%
  - Coloured: 1.3%
  - Indian/Asian: 6.8%
  - White: 59.8%
  - Other: 2.2%

First languages (2011)
  - English: 65.7%
  - Zulu: 6.8%
  - Tswana: 6.0%
  - Afrikaans: 5.9%
  - Other: 15.6%
- Time zone: UTC+2 (SAST)
- Postal code (street): 2196

Birdhaven is a suburb of Johannesburg, South Africa. It is adjacent to the suburb of Melrose. It is located in Region E of the City of Johannesburg Metropolitan Municipality.

== History ==
The suburb is situated on parts of the old Witwatersrand farms called Syferfontein and Zandfontein. It would be proclaimed as suburb on 8 October 1949 and its name is derived from either the bird sanctuary next door or Jack Bird Barregar and the company Bird Investments.

It has traditionally been a centre for Johannesburg's Jewish community. Jewish residents made up 60.8% of the population in 1971.

During the apartheid era, it was classed as a "whites only" area under the terms of the Group Areas Act. In 1991, the Abolition of Racially Based Land Measures Act, 1991 repealed the Group Areas Act.
