= Witzieshoek revolt =

1950 Basotho uprising in South Africa

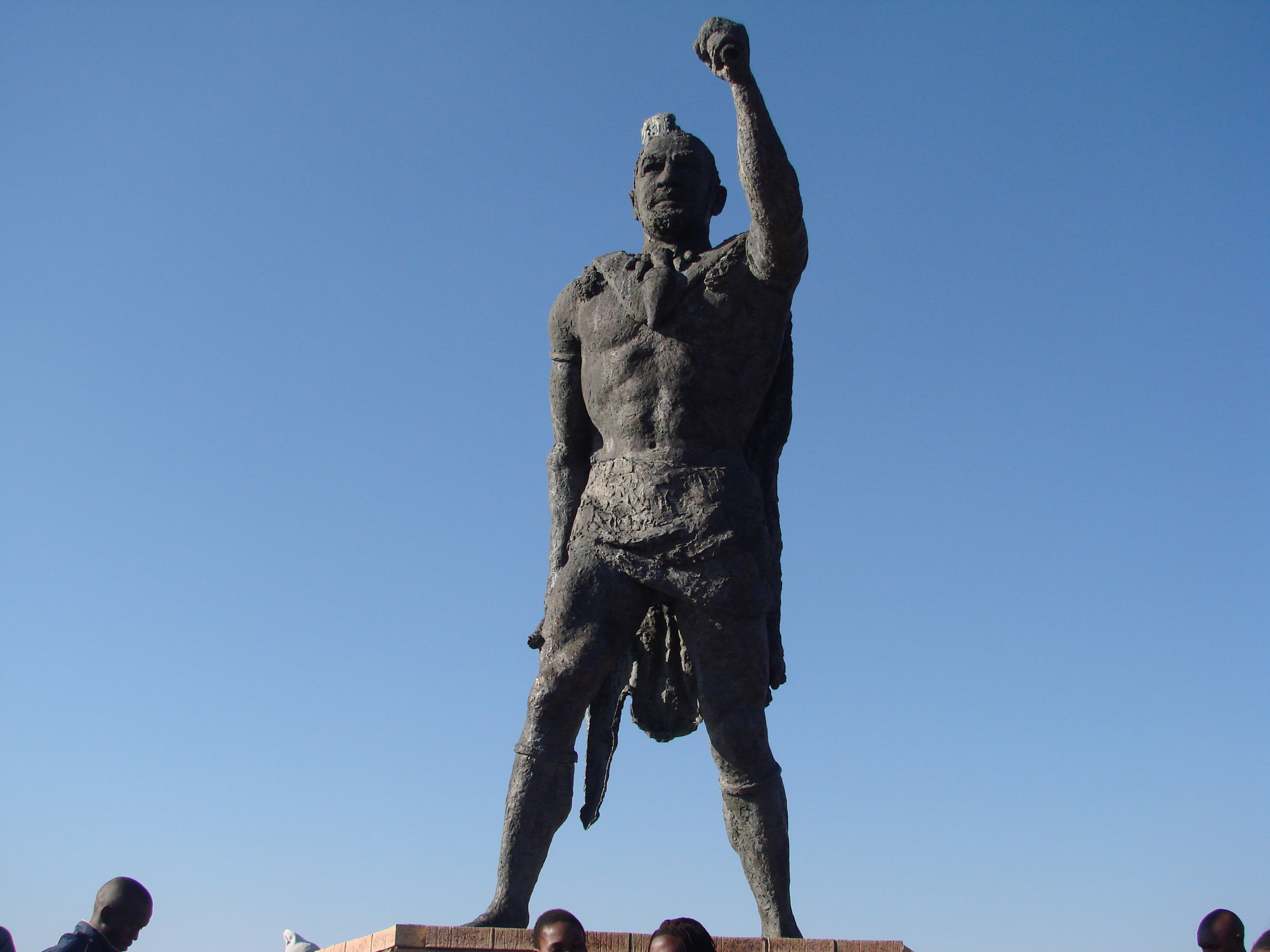
- The statue of Paulus Mopeli Mokhachane, the great-grandfather to leader of the 1951 Namoha resistance, Paulus Howel Mopeli.
Date	November 1950
Location	Witzieshoek, South Africa
Result	Uprising suppressed

Belligerents
Union of South Africa	Basotho rebels

Commanders and leaders
(Union of South Africa) Daniel François Malan	Paulus Howel Mopeli

The Witzieshoek revolt was a rebellion of Basotho residents in Witzieshoek in the Orange Free State of South Africa during the mid 20th century. It arose as a result of South African government interventions into the traditional farming practices of the Basotho, specifically those that limited the number of stock Basotho could keep and required the culling of excess. Passive resistance to the government’s legislation had escalated in the 1940s to active disobedience, when in November 1950 a confrontation between police and Basotho farmers turned violent. Fourteen Basotho were killed, and eight others deemed to be ringleaders were later sentenced to terms of imprisonment and banishment from Witzieshoek.

== Overview ==
In the 1950s, Witzieshoek (modern day Phuthaditjhaba) was part of a parcel of land bordering Lesotho in the former Orange Free State of South Africa that was designated as a native reserve of the Basotho ethnic group. The land, approximately 40,000 hectares (99,000 acres), had been ceded to the Basotho under Paulus Mopeli – half-brother to King Moshoeshoe I of Lesotho – by the president of the Orange Free State Johannes Brand, in a peace treaty known as the "Kgotso ya Mabele" or "Peace of Sorghum" in 1866.

In 1936, the Native Trust and Land Act was passed by the South African parliament. This Act effectively created a body responsible for acquiring and maintaining small strips of land intended for blacks to farm and cultivate; in the name of "betterment", the body would come to impose laws permitting the culling of stock to avoid overgrazing. This intervention was met with resistance by the Basotho in Witzieshoek and in the 1950s, after a series of protests and court actions, a stand-off between the community and local authorities turned violent, resulting in the deaths of more than thirteen people.

== Disputes over livestock ==
Under Proclamation No/ 31 of 1939, Witziehoek was declared a Betterment Territory, the first of many such schemes by the government within native reserves. With this, the government hoped to be able to concentrate the Basotho into a smaller area and, in turn, conserve the broader area with the most arable land for white farmers. By the 1940s, the state had placed a limit on the number of livestock per person living within the reserve. The authorities and locals came to an agreement where surplus cattle would be culled. But the Basotho began to regard the Betterment Scheme as a hindrance, limiting their ability to rely on their livestock for survival and destroying their traditional and cultural exchange mechanisms.

In 1942, the cattle-bearing capacity of Witzeihoek was identified as approximately 12,500 head, but by 1946 the reserve held 13,500 head of cattle. The state intended to cull the excess cattle and restore the reserve to its calculated maximum capacity. Their plan was met by resistance from within the reserve's community, under the leadership of Paulus Howel Mopeli, great-grandson of Paulus Mopeli. Mopeli refused to allow his cattle to be culled, and he and three other cattle owners appeared in court for disobeying the authorities, although the case was set aside. Mopeli's actions were regarded as heroic and inspired a wave of resistance across the reserve, with many other stock owners refusing to have their cattle culled.

== Mass resistance ==
By the end of 1949, the Basotho community’s defiance ranged from passive resistance to active sabotage. Approximately 3 kilometres (1.9 mi) of fencing running along the demarcated reserve were destroyed, and some white farmers' plantations were partially burnt. The Native Commissioner failed to heed the continuing outcry from the Basotho over the slaughtering of their cattle.

The culling that was scheduled to take place on 8 January 1950 came to mark a turning point in the Basotho resistance movement. The Principal Agricultural Officer documented that only 71 stock owners had brought in their cattle at the allocated culling time. Even then, the culling process was cut short by horse riders who threatened violence on the officer and drove the remaining cattle away. Despite court orders demanding the Basotho cease and desist, resistance continued. On 14 March, approximately three hundred men and women returned their stock cards and land allotment certificates to Native Trust officials. In response, a letter was given to them to evacuate the native reserve immediately.

In October 1950, a Commission of Enquiry was launched. The Basotho, under Paulus Mopeli’s leadership, refused to recognise the Commission, claiming it was made up of white men who were not acting impartially.

== Violent confrontations at Namoha ==
On 27 November 1950, Paulus Mopeli, Scotland Koloi, Paulus Mpheteng and Letsie Mopeli were scheduled to testify at the Commission of Enquiry. The men did not show up and instead held their own gathering at Namoha village. As a result, Proclamation 28 of 1950 was issued by the government, deeming public gatherings of three or more people illegal.

Police reinforcements, led by Major I.P.S. Terblanche, were deployed into Witziehoek with the intention of using violence to suppress the outcry and subpoena the four men. The Basotho refused to disperse upon the arrival of the police, and Major Terblanche sent Constable Ntsane Mopeli, who doubled as an interpreter, to find the subpoenaed men in the crowd.

The constable's horse was struck with a stick by someone in the crowd; the animal reared and the constable fell. Shortly afterwards, Major Terblanche ordered his men to fire into the crowd. The first casualty was Sejeso Dhlamina. Thirteen other Basotho people were shot and killed. Two black police officers were struck down.

== Court verdict ==
In December 1950, Native Affairs Minister Hendrik Verwoerd signed a proclamation that enabled the arrest of the main actors of the protracted dispute. By November 1951, the deadly standoff had been brought to trial: Justice De Beer handed down sentences of imprisonment and banishment to 79 Basotho men and women. 25 of those standing trial were discharged, while the six people identified as the main actors were sentenced to imprisonment with terms ranging from 18 months to five years. Eight people, including Paulus Howell Mopeli, were banished from Witzieshoek. Mopeli himself was sent to Johannesburg to serve a prison sentence, after which he served a banishment term in Middleburg. Despite accounts from multiple witnesses that Major Terblanche fired into the crowd without warning or provocation, the judge deemed the gathering of more than 300 men in the wake of all that occurred to be a sign of the Basotho's violent intentions.

== See also ==
- Natives Land Act, 1913
