= Tomlinson Report (South Africa) =

Commission on the economic viability of the bantustans

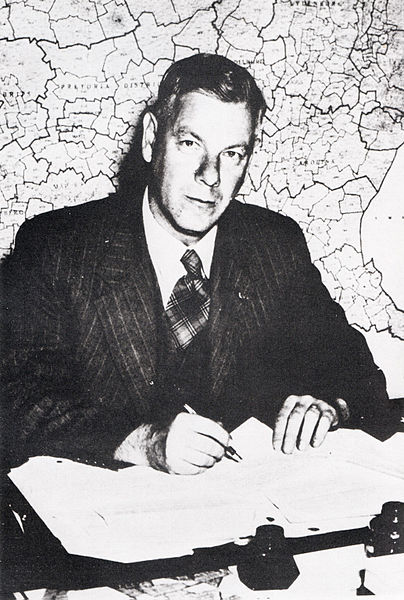
Hendrik Verwoerd, Minister of Native Affairs.

The Tomlinson Report was a 1954 report released by the Commission for the Socioeconomic Development of the Bantu Areas, known as the Tomlinson Commission, that was commissioned by the South African government to study the economic viability of the native reserves (later formed into the bantustans). These reserves were intended to serve as the homelands for the black population. The report is named for Frederick R. Tomlinson, professor of agricultural economics at the University of Pretoria. Tomlinson chaired the ten-person commission, which was established in 1950. The Tomlinson Report found that the reserves were incapable of containing South Africa's black population without significant state investment. However, Hendrik Verwoerd, Minister of Native Affairs, rejected several recommendations in the report. While both Verwoerd and the Tomlinson Commission believed in "separate development" for the reserves, Verwoerd did not want to end economic interdependence between the reserves and industries in white-controlled areas. The government would go on to pass legislation to restrict the movement of blacks who lived in the reserves to white-controlled areas.

== Background ==
The South African government established native reserves in the 1913 Natives Land Act as areas designated for black citizens to live in. As a result of the 1913 act, blacks could no longer own land outside of the native reserves. The 1923 Native (Urban Areas) Act authorized local governments to establish residential areas designated for black citizens, leading to the development of low-wage laborer migration to urban areas from the native reserves. While the government had intended to strictly control any limited presence of native laborers in urban areas, by World War II declining conditions had led to an outflow from the native reserves and the number of black urban residents had surpassed the number of white urban residents.

In 1948, the National Party, which had campaigned on establishing an apartheid regime, came to power. The newly-elected government began to engage in dialogue over the state of the native reserves and how increased black urbanization affected the apartheid vision. The South African Bureau for Racial Affairs (SABRA), a conservative think tank at Stellenbosch University founded in September 1948, emphasized the need for "vertical" segregation, a system which would enforce total segregation for blacks from the broader political sphere but allow for political advancement within the native reserves. Verwoerd, who became head of the Native Affairs Department in 1950, stated in a 1948 speech to Parliament both that South Africa was a "white man’s country and that he must remain master here," but that, in the reserves, "we are prepared to allow the Natives to be the masters." Verwoerd stated in 1950 his belief in the importance of separate political development for the reserves, stating there was "no policy of oppression here, but one of creating a situation which has never existed for the Bantu; namely, that, taking into consideration their languages, traditions, history and different national communities, they may pass through a development of their own.” Verwoerd did not fully align with SABRA in his views; he belonged to a faction in the National Party that sought to enforce racial segregation to pursue grand apartheid and believed in the principles of vertical segregation, but did not want to negatively impact business interests that depended on black labor by enforcing a complete separation between the black population and the white population. In 1951, the year after the Tomlinson Report was commissioned, the government passed the Bantu Authorities Act. The Bantu Authorities Act abolished the Natives Representative Council and created a new hierarchy for tribal, regional and territorial authorities.

== Creation and composition ==
In 1950, the Federal Mission Council of the Dutch Reformed Church passed a resolution that called on the government to examine "native life," particularly with regards to socioeconomic development in the native reserves. That same year, the government appointed the Commission for the Socioeconomic Development of the Bantu Areas to devise "a comprehensive scheme for the rehabilitation of the Native Areas with a view to developing within them a social structure in keeping with the culture of the Native and based upon effective socio-economic planning." The commission was created with support from SABRA and included SABRA members.

The commission was composed of 10 members, included four academics (including Tomlinson) and two Afrikaner farmers:

- Frederick R. Tomlinson
- Chris Prinsloo of the Urban Affairs Section, Native Affairs Department
- M. C. de Wet Nel of the Native Affairs Group, Native Affairs Department
- C. B. Young, Under-Secretary for the Native Areas, Native Affairs Department
- J. H. J. van Rensburg, commander-general for the Ossewabrandwag.
- G. J. Badenhorst
- C. H. Badenhorst
- J. H. R. Bisschop, professor of veterinary science (replacement F. X. Laubscher, who resigned)
- J. H. Moolman
- F. H. Botha (Secretary)

In the process of drafting the report, the commission enlisted research specialists.

== Contents of the report ==
The Tomlinson Report was presented to the government in October 1954 and ran, in its unabridged form, to 3,755 pages published in 17 volumes. The report included 589 tables and 66 maps. The report stated that the government could pursue either integration or total segregation, and strongly emphasized that the government pursue total segregation by industrializing the reserves to make them "economically viable." The report recommended that land additional to the land set aside in the 1936 Land Act be purchased and annexed to the reserves, and that the state develop industries in the reserves to create an additional 300,000 jobs. Even then, the report said, the reserves would only be able to include 15 million of South Africa's projected black population by the year 2000; the commission projected that 6.5 million blacks would be residing in the "European Areas." The Report also concluded that the traditional 'tribal' authorities used to rule the reserves were not adequate for industrialized areas. In the report, the commission reiterated their commitment to separate development in the reserves to achieve racial harmony. One section stated that “welfare should be measured by the standards of the people whose welfare is envisaged," and that Africans “should not be ignored nor treated as inferior, merely because they [scale of values] are different.”

=== Funding recommendations ===
The commission concluded that if the reserves were to support the growing black population the government would need to invest at least £104 million over the following decade to ensure fully diversified economies in the reserves. The commission offered the following prospective allocations for the £104 million:

- Agricultural development – £33,886,000
  - Soil reclamation — £27,400,000
  - Credit facilities – £3,000,000
  - Sugar-cane production — £370,000
  - Fibre production — £116,000
  - Irrigation — £3,000,000
- Forestry development — £3,000,000
- Mining development — £1,000,000
- Manufacturing and tertiary activities — £30,000,000
- Urban development — £12,000,000
- Transport and other basic facilities — £13,000,000
- Health services — £5,000,000
- Educational services — £3,000,000
- Welfare services — £3,600,000
- Total estimated expenditure: £104,486,000

=== Development scheme ===
The commission was critical of existing development efforts within the native reserves, stating that “individually and collectively the existing organisations do not comply with the new requirements set by the development programme. The deplorable conditions which prevail in the Bantu Areas today also testify to their present incapacity to bring about any significant development, and even to prevent deterioration." The commission suggested that the Native Affairs Department undergo a re-organization to better support development progress. Specifically, the commission called for establishing a development council that would advise the Minister of Native Affairs on native reserves by conducting research on trends and needs in the reserves. The commission also called for the creation of a development corporation that would both promote black enterprises in the reserves and create enterprises that would be transferred to black ownership. As part of development activities, the commission stated that Church activities should be seen as integral to the development process.

=== Policy recommendations ===
The report offered three major recommendations for the government's economic policies in the reserves.

First, the commission advocated for an agricultural rehabilitation scheme. The scheme would separate peasant farmers from workers. In coming to this conclusion, the commission surveyed 111 peasant farmers and stated, based on the results, that “£56 p.a. is large enough to attract a Bantu to full-time farming in mixed farming and pastoral areas, and to bind him permanently to the land.”

Second, the commission recommended that native reserve land be divided into "economic farming units" under individual ownership.

Third, the commission recommended that the government push for industrialization in the reserves to incorporate those who, as a result of land reform, would become dispossessed. The commission called for investment in "European capital" and in education, particularly through the previously mentioned development corporation.

== Reception ==
Verwoerd refused to implement several of the report's recommendations despite accepting the report "in principle". Verwoerd's objection focused in part on certain items that were allocated funding in the budget, expressing his wish to limit spending at £36.6 million. He rejected the idea of allowing, as the report suggested, white industrialists to enter the reserves; therefore, he stated that funding allocated for the development corporation, which was "presumably based upon the principle ... of the admission of large European privately owned industries into the Bantu areas," could be excluded from the budget. Instead of creating a program for "white capital" to enter the reserves, Verwoerd advocated for establishing “border industries." Verwoerd also argued that the amounts set aside for agricultural development and urban development could be brought down dramatically. Finally, he rejected the idea of eliminating communal ownership of land. Verwoerd stated that the Native Affairs Department would rely on “other considered views based upon much wider practical experience of administrative affairs” to determine proper financial funding for the reserves. Verwoerd's opinions reflected the opinions of others in the National Party who did not want to curb dependence on African labor.

Some faculty members from SABRA received the report well, viewing it as evidence that “apartheid could and must be made to work.” Some members of SABRA voiced their displeasure with Verwoerd's refusal to implement most recommendations in the report. J.L. Sadie, a professor at Stellenbosch University, wrote an article in January 1957 for the South African Institute of Race Relations that criticized Verwoerd's decision to not allow for private industry in the reserves. Sadie argued that foreign capitalists had already invested heavily in South Africa without making the country any less "South African." Attendees at a June 1956 congress organized by the Dutch Reformed Churches, SABRA and the Federation of Afrikaans Cultural Organizations commended the Tomlinson Commission for its report without directing any criticism at the government.

In 1956, more than 400 delegates to the Interdenominational African Ministers' Federation (IAMF) conference in Bloemfontein voted to reject the Tomlinson Report.

== Impact ==
The recommendations of the Tomlinson Report aligned with the government's belief in "separate development" for whites and blacks. Even though the government did not follow several recommendations in the report, the government still sought to confine blacks to the reserves as much as they could without curtailing dependence on black labor.

Parliament passed several pieces of legislation that defined the segregated nature and structure of the reserves in the following years. Under Verwoerd, who became Prime Minister in 1958, the legislature passed the Promotion of Bantu Self-Government Act of 1959. This act created "bantustans," or separate homelands for blacks, that were established based on linguistic and cultural differences. The act intended to develop self-government for the bantustans. In 1970, Parliament passed the Bantu Homelands Citizenship Act, and in 1971, the legislature passed the Bantu Homelands Constitution Act. The Bantu Homelands Citizenship Act designated blacks as citizens of their bantustans, and the Bantu Homelands Constitution Act gave the president the power to create tribal, regional and territories authorities. The Bantu Homelands Citizenship Act designated black workers as “foreign visitors” in white areas and led to the government forcibly resettling blacks in the bantustans. The Tomlinson Report had recommended that "all-Union Bantu" be regarded as foreigners. As the Tomlinson Commission had concluded, the reserves as they existed could not provide economic opportunities for most black residents beyond agriculture; blacks that migrated to the bantustans were concentrated in border areas and commuted into white areas for their jobs. In 1986, the government abolished pass laws and in 1994, the end of apartheid also led to the end of the bantustans.
