= Sebolai Matlosa =

Mosotho writer and teacher

- Born: 25 December 1915; Mafeteng
- Died: unknown unknown
- Occupations: novelist, playwright, teacher
- Writing career
- Notable work: Mopheme

Sebolai Matlosa (25 December 1915–?) was a Mosotho novelist, playwright and teacher. He is sometimes referred to by his Christian name, Sylvanus.

Matlosa is best known for his 1965 novel, Mopheme, which was adapted into a Sesotho TV drama in the 1980s starring Kgotso Nkgatho.

== Life ==
Sebolai Matlosa was born in Mafeteng on 25 December 1915, the fourth child of Matebi, a herdsman, and 'Malisebo Matlosa. His father died when he was young and, after his elder brother also died, Matlosa was sent to live with his maternal uncle.

He went on to be educated at Healdtown in the then Cape Colony where he obtained his teacher's certificate. Matlosa then taught at Masitise Secondary School in Quthing and in later life ran a butchers.

His death is not recorded in any public records.

== Works ==
Matlosa's first novel, Molahlehi, or The Lost One, was published in 1946. The novel follows the title character as he is sent to school by his struggling family. Molahlehi quickly gets into trouble and is soon expelled alongside his new friends, who then leave for Johannesburg. In the city, he continues to be in trouble, before marrying his friend's cousin, Sainyaka. The ending of the novel sees Molahlehi attempting to make amends, but before he can do so he is killed by a white man who mistakes him for a thief. Gérard notes that the book is clearly an effort to emphasise the importance of education and the dangers of the city.

Matlosa then published a play, Katiba, in 1950. In the play, Chief Katiba is advised by a traditional doctor, Phothoma, to undertake a ritual murder. The Chief's accomplices are arrested, and he is haunted by the murder for the rest of his life, losing his position as chief along the way. Lesaoana interprets this tale as a protest again ritual murder and the hypocrisy of traditional doctors. These themes were also dealt with by A.S. Mopeli-Paulus in his novel Liretlo published the same year.

His final novel, Mopheme, or The Silver Fox, did not appear until 1965. Mopheme reflects Matlosa's own upbrining by his aunt and uncle, and tells the story of Lesokolla, a wealthy man who decides to marry a second wife. The second wife, Baratang, is domineering and marginalises the first wife, Botle. She causes problems in the household and has a liaison with a man called Mokupu. Baratang and Mokupu plot and kill Lesokolla while Tshitso, the only son of Botle, narrowly escapes. Baratang and Mokupu then inherit Lesokolla livestock, but years later Tshitso returns to exact his revenge before eventually offering forgiveness.

Makke regards Mopheme as one of the most underrated Sesotho novels. While Matlosa deals with the themes of polygamy and justice, he does not, like most contemporary Sesotho novelists, turn to biblical moralisation.

Mopheme was later turned into a 19-episode TV drama starring Kgotso Nkgatho and Lillian Dube. Nkgatho had first read Mopheme as part of the curriculum at a college he was attending several years after the novel was first published.

== Complete works ==
- Matlosa, Sebolai (1946). Molahlehi (in Southern Sotho). Morija: Sesuto Book Depot.
- —— (1950). Katiba (in Southern Sotho). Mazenod: Mazenod Book Centre.
- —— (1965). Mopheme (in Southern Sotho). Johannesburg: Willem Gouws.

== Sources ==
- Gérard, Albert S (1971). Four African literatures: Xhosa, Sotho, Zulu, Amharic. Berkeley: University of California Press.
- Lesaoana, Mpho Blandina (2009). The Place of N.M. Khaketla's Selected Plays in the Development of Sesotho Drama (PDF) (MA thesis). National University of Lesotho.
- Maake, Nhlanhla (2006). "Watermarks in the Sesotho Novels of the Twentieth Century". Research in African Literatures. 37 (3): 65–82.
- Maphike, Pule Ranaileng Stephen (1991). History of southern sotho literature as system, 1930-1960 (PhD thesis). University of South Africa.
- Mda, Zakes (2009). "The Pink Mountain: Landscapes and the Conception of a Literature of Public Action". Journal of the African Literature Association. 3 (2): 97–109. doi:10.1080/21674736.2009.11690109.
- Ndhlovu, Ntombi (29 April 2013). "Just another feather in his cap". The Star Late Edition. Johannesburg: Sekunjalo Independent Media.
