= Black Communities Development Act, 1984 =

Parliament of South Africa
- Long title: To provide for the purposeful development of Black communities outside the national states; to amend and consolidate certain laws which apply with reference to such communities; and to provide for matters connected therewith.
- Citation: Act No. 4 of 1984
- Enacted by: Parliament of South Africa
- Royal assent: 22 February 1984
- Commenced: 2 March 1984
- Repealed: 30 June 1991
- Administered by: Minister of Co-operation and Development

Repealed by
- Abolition of Racially Based Land Measures Act, 1991
- Status: Repealed

The Black Communities Development Act, 1984, formed part of the apartheid system of racial segregation in South Africa. It provided for the purposeful development of Black communities outside the national states; to amend and consolidate certain laws which apply with reference to such communities; and to provide for matters connected therewith. The act was repealed in 1991.
