= Native Laws Amendment Act, 1952 =

Part of the apartheid system of racial segregation in South Africa

Parliament of South Africa
- Long title: Act to amend the Native Labour Regulation Act, 1911, the Natives Land Act, 1913, the Native Administration Act, 1927, the Native Administration Act, 1927, Amendment Act, 1929, and the Natives (Urban Areas) Consolidation Act, 1945; to repeal certain provisions of British Bechuanaland Proclamation No. 2 of 1885 and to repeal the Natives (Urban Areas) Amendment Act, 1945.
- Citation: Act No. 54 of 1952
- Enacted by: Parliament of South Africa
- Royal assent: 24 June 1952
- Commenced: 27 June 1952
- Status: Spent

The Native Laws Amendment Act, 1952 (Act No. 54 of 1952, subsequently renamed the Bantu Laws Amendment Act, 1952 and the Black Laws Amendment Act, 1952), formed part of the apartheid system of racial segregation in South Africa. It amended section 10 of the Group Areas Act. It limited the category of blacks who had the right to permanent residence in urban areas. While Section 10 had granted permanent residence to blacks who had been born in a town and had lived there continuously for more than 15 years, or who had been employed there continuously for at least 15 years, or who had worked continuously for the same employer for more than 10 years. Non-whites living in urban areas who did not meet these criteria faced forcible removal.
