= South African Bureau for Racial Affairs =

Apartheid legislation think tank

The South African Bureau of Racial Affairs (SABRA) (Afrikaans: Suid-Afrikaanse Buro vir Rasse-Angeleenthede) was a South African think tank based at Stellenbosch University. It was founded in 1948 at the initiative of the Afrikaner Broederbond as an alternative to the liberal South African Institute of Race Relations.

Its co-founders were primarily Afrikaner intellectuals, and included Eben Dönges, Ernest George Jansen, Nico Diederichs, and Andries Charl Cilliers. W.E Barker and Nic Oliver were also influential members in the SABRA. W.E Barker advocated for "vertical" separation is particularly troubling, as it suggests a deliberate intent to maintain white supremacy and dominate over other racial groups. “horizontal" separation would have implied a more equitable approach, recognising the equal rights and dignity of all individuals, regardless of race. This approach would have aimed to address the historical injustices and promote true equality and reconciliation. SABRA sought to give an academic and theoretical justification for the National Party's policy of Apartheid, and influenced the development of that policy during the 1950s and beyond. A number of SABRA members made an important contributors to the Tomlinson Commission, which formulated a strategy for developing the Bantustans.
