= Natives (Prohibition of Interdicts) Act, 1956 =

Parliament of South Africa
- Long title: Act to prohibit the granting of interdicts or other dilatory orders of court having the effect of staying or suspending the removal or ejectment of natives in certain cases, and to provide for other incidental matters.
- Citation: Act No. 64 of 1956
- Enacted by: Parliament of South Africa
- Royal assent: 15 June 1956
- Commenced: 22 June 1956
- Repealed: 1 July 1986

Repealed by
- Abolition of Influx Control Act, 1986
- Status: Repealed

Natives (Prohibition of Interdicts) Act, Act No 64 of 1956, formed part of the apartheid system of racial segregation in South Africa. It deprived Africans of the right to appeal to the courts by means of an interdict or any legal process against forced removals.

== Content of the Act ==
The following is a brief description of the sections of the Natives (Prohibition of Interdicts) Act:

Section 1

Defined the meanings of common words within the Act.

Section 2

Defines that the execution of some orders of court would not be able to be stayed or suspended by means of legal processes. This applied to orders to vacate, to be removed or arrested and detained to or from an area.

Section 3

Defines that any stay or suspension of a court order to which the Act applies, especially prior to Act, would have no force and effect and would lapse.

Section 4

Defines the compensation to be repaid for actual loss to a Native who obtained the order of court and has since been declared invalid.

Section 5

Defines the Governor-General will proclaim in the Government Gazette, to which type of orders the Act will apply too and from what date.

Section 6

Defined the name of the Act and when it comes into operation.
