= Monontsha =

Monontsha is a rural village of Maluti-a-Phofung Local Municipality, Thabo Mofutsanyana District Municipality in the Free State province of South Africa.
