= Industrial Conciliation Act, 1956 =

Part of the apartheid system of racial segregation in South Africa

Parliament of South Africa
- Long title: An Act to consolidate and amend the law relating to the registration and regulation of trade unions and employers' organizations, the prevention and settlement of disputes between employers and employees, the regulation of terms and conditions of employment by agreement and arbitration and the control of private registry offices; to provide for the establishment of an industrial tribunal and to define its functions; to provide safeguards against inter-racial competition; and to provide for other incidental matters.
- Citation: Act No. 28 of 1956
- Enacted by: Parliament of South Africa
- Royal assent: 7 May 1956
- Commenced: 1 January 1957
- Repealed: 11 November 1996
- Administered by: Minister of Labour

Repealed by
- Labour Relations Act, 1995
- Status: Repealed

The Industrial Conciliation Act, 1956 (Act No. 28 of 1956; subsequently renamed the Labour Relations Act, 1956), formed part of the apartheid system of racial segregation in South Africa. It prohibited the registration of any new 'mixed' unions and imposed racially separate branches and all-white executive committees on existing 'mixed' unions. It prohibited strikes in 'essential industries' for both black and white workers and banned political affiliations for unions. Clause 77 legalized the reservation of skilled jobs to white workers, as the Bantu Building Workers Act of 1951 had done in the construction trade, 'to ensure that they will not be exploited by the lower standard of living of any other race'.

The primary objective of the Industrial Conciliation Act was to separate the trade union movements along racial lines, with the aim of weakening them. The Act ended the recognition of trade unions with white, Coloured, and Indian membership. It specified that trade unions with mixed membership had to cater exclusively to one racial group or split into separate racial sections, each under the guidance of a white-controlled executive. At this time, Africans had not yet been granted permission to belong to a registered union. The Act also gave additional powers to the minister to declare strikes illegal in essential industries. Whites are thought to have benefited from this Act because it gave legal force to white job reservation practices.

The amendments introduced by the Industrial Conciliation Amendment Act, 1979, attempted to control African trade unions by incorporating them into the industrial-relations machinery. African trade unions could apply for registration and, if recognised by employers, establish a checkoff system to collect subscriptions and negotiate wage agreements. Government employees were excluded from the scope of the Act, and trade unions were not allowed to have any connection with a political party.

== Repeal ==
The act was repealed by the Labour Relations Act No 66 of 1995.
