= Prevention of Illegal Squatting Act, 1951 =

Apartheid law in South Africa

Parliament of South Africa
- Long title: Act to provide for the prevention and control of illegal squatting on public or private land.
- Citation: Act No. 52 of 1951
- Enacted by: Parliament of South Africa
- Royal assent: 21 June 1951
- Commenced: 6 July 1951
- Repealed: 5 June 1998

Repealed by
- Prevention of Illegal Eviction from and Unlawful Occupation of Land Act, 1998
- Status: Repealed

The Prevention of Illegal Squatting Act, Act No 52 of 1951, formed part of the apartheid system of racial segregation in South Africa. This act authorized the forcible removal of squatting communities. It allowed eviction and destruction of homes of squatters by landowners, local authorities, and government officials. It was commenced on 6 July 1951.

== Content of the Act ==
The following is a brief description of the sections of the Prevention of Illegal Squatting Act:

Section 1

Defined that no person, except authorised by law, could enter or remain in or on land or buildings without the permission of the owner or lawful occupier. Nor could one, except by lawful reason, enter or remain in a native location, village or area except by the permission of the local authority or person in legal control of the area.

Section 2.1

Defined the penalties for contravening Section 1 as a fine up to £25, or up to three months' imprisonment, or both.

Section 2.2

Defined that after being convicted in Section 2.1, continuing to re-offend, the fine will be up to £25, and up to seven days imprisonment per each day of the offence, or both.

Section 3.1

Defined that the person convicted in Section 2 could be issued with a court order to evict them from land, buildings, native location, village or area. Further defined that the person convicted could be issued with further court orders in order to evict and transfer the person or persons from an area to another area even outside the courts jurisdiction and ensure the destruction and removal of any buildings or structures on said land, buildings, native location, village or area.

Section 3.2

Defined the power of Magistrates or Native Commissioners to decide, where the person or persons have been removed to a new area, to move them on to another area more suitable for accommodation or employment.

Section 4.1

Defined the penalties for the collection of fees or charges or exercising authority regarding the organizing of illegal squatting. Fine would not be more than £100, or up to twelve months' imprisonment, or both. Included is the ability of the court to seize funds obtained during the illegal squatting.

Section 4.2

Defined the courts right to pass civil judgement to claim funds or fees obtained during the illegal squatting if not seized at the time of conviction.

Section 5.1

Defined the powers of the Magistrate to issue orders to remove persons or persons from land, buildings, native location, village or area, remove them to another area more suitable and ensure the destruction and removal of any illegal buildings or structures. All were subject to an affidavit presented to the Magistrate by the landowner or lawful occupier of the land or buildings which was illegally occupied and that said persons or person had refused to remove themselves. Or similarly, an affidavit issued by a government department, local authority and police. Before the illegal occupier could be issued with an order for removal, the affidavit would be posted on the building or land giving the former, three days notice in the official two languages and native language of the former, that an application was to be heard before the Magistrate and their rights to be present and represented at the hearing.

Section 5.2

Defined the power of Magistrates or Native Commissioners to decide, where the person or persons have been removed to a new area, to move them on to another area more suitable for accommodation or employment.

Section 6.1

Defined the powers of the Local Authority, under the directions of the Minister of Justice or Native Affairs, to establish an emergency camp for displaced persons and issue regulations, approved by the Governor-General, to administer, maintain and provide health and sanitation to the camp.

Section 6.2

Defined the right to charge fees and levies for accommodation and services, establish different provisions for different classes of people and setting the penalties for contravening the regulations as a £10 fine or two months' imprisonment, or both and for subsequent convictions, £25 fine or three months' imprisonment, or both.

Section 6.3

Defined that the regulations be published in the Government Gazette in both official languages and furthermore published at the camp in the language of the occupiers.

Section 6.4

Defined that if the emergency camp became a native township under Natives (Urban Areas) Consolidation Act 25, 1945, the local authority might be exempt from Section 18.1 of the said Act.

Section 6.5

Defined the Governor-General's right to remove the proclamation of an emergency camp through the Government Gazette.

Section 7

Defined that the obstruction of the police and authorized persons was prohibited in terms of Sections 3 and 5 and were, subject to a conviction, of a fine of £100, one year in jail or both.

Section 8

Defined that contrary to other laws, the Magistrates courts would have jurisdiction over the Act.

Section 9

Defined the repeal of War Measures Continuation Act 29, 1950 and War Measure No. 31 of 1944.

Section 10

Defined the meaning of the word local authority in the text of the Act.

Section 11.1

Defined, exception for Section 9, that the Governor-General proclaims areas to be under the control of the act and their date in the Government Gazette.

Section 11.2

Defined the Governor-General's right to remove the proclamation of areas or parts of areas through the Government Gazette.

Section 12

Defined the name of the Act.
