= Abolition of Racially Based Land Measures Act, 1991 =

South African legislation

Parliament of South Africa
- Long title: Act to repeal or amend certain laws so as to abolish certain restrictions based on race or membership of a specific population group on the acquisition and utilization of rights to land; to provide for the rationalization or phasing out of certain racially based institutions and statutory and regulatory systems; for the regulation of norms and standards in residential environments; and for the establishment of a commission under the name of the Advisory Commission on Land Allocation; and to provide for matters connected therewith.
- Citation: Act No. 108 of 1991
- Territorial extent: Republic of South Africa
- Enacted by: Parliament of South Africa
- Assented to by: President F. W. de Klerk
- Assented to: 27 June 1991
- Commenced: 30 June 1991

Repeals
- Black Land Act, 1913; Development Trust and Land Act, 1936; Unbeneficial Occupation of Farms Act, 1937; Coloured Persons Settlement Act, 1946; Asiatic Land Tenure Act, 1946; Black Affairs Act, 1959; Rural Coloured Areas Act, 1963; Group Areas Act, 1966; Black Communities Development Act, 1984

Summary
- Repealed laws that imposed racially based restrictions on land ownership and use.
- Status: Spent

The Abolition of Racially Based Land Measures Act, 1991 (Act No. 108 of 1991) is an act of the Parliament of South Africa which repealed many of the apartheid laws that imposed race-based restrictions on land ownership and land use. Among the laws repealed were the Black Land Act, 1913 (formerly the Native Land Act), the Development Trust and Land Act, 1936 (formerly the Native Trust and Land Act) and the Group Areas Act, 1966.

In his speech at the Opening of Parliament on 1 February 1991, State President F. W. de Klerk announced that the Land Acts and the Group Areas Act would be repealed. A white paper on the topic was tabled on 12 March. The bill was passed by Parliament on 5 June, signed by President de Klerk on 27 June, and came into force on 30 June. The reasons that the white minority government repealed what had been its key legislation were to respond to longstanding demands by activists, to build its legitimacy ahead of the negotiations for a transition to democracy and to preempt more radical reforms that the democratic state would potentially bring.

== List of repealed principal acts ==
- Black Land Act, 1913 (Native Land Act, 1913)
- Development Trust and Land Act, 1936 (Native Trust and Land Act, 1936)
- Unbeneficial Occupation of Farms Act, 1937
- Coloured Persons Settlement Act, 1946
- Asiatic Land Tenure Act, 1946
- Black Affairs Act, 1959 (Native Affairs Act, 1959)
- Rural Coloured Areas Act, 1963
- Group Areas Act, 1966
- Black Communities Development Act, 1984
