= Native Building Workers Act, 1951 =

Part of the apartheid system of racial segregation in South Africa

Parliament of South Africa
- Long title: Act to provide for the training and registration of native building workers, for the regulation of their employment and conditions of employment, and for other incidental matters.
- Citation: Act No. 27 of 1951
- Enacted by: Parliament of South Africa
- Royal assent: 26 April 1951
- Commenced: 10 October 1951
- Repealed: 1 August 1980
- Administered by: Minister of Labour

Repealed by
- Industrial Conciliation Amendment Act, 1980
- Status: Repealed

The Native Building Workers Act, 1951 (Act No. 27 of 1951; subsequently renamed the Bantu Building Workers Act, 1951 and the Black Building Workers Act, 1951) formed part of the apartheid system of racial segregation in South Africa. It legalized the training of blacks in skilled labor in the construction industry, but limited the places in which they were permitted to work. Sections 15 and 19 made it an offense for blacks to work in the employ of whites performing skilled labor in their homes. It was repealed by section 11 of the Industrial Conciliation Amendment Act, Act No. 95 of 1980.
