= Kgotso Nkgatho =

South African actor

- Born: 1953 (age 72–73); Mmamahabane, Ventersburg, Free State, Union of South Africa
- Education: Central University of Technology
- Occupation: Actor
- Years active: 1977–present
- Awards: South African Film and Television Awards,2019

Kgotso Nkgatho (born 1953) is a South African actor, author, scriptwriter, producer, and director famous for his role in Mopheme.

== Early life ==
Kgotso Nkgatho was born in Mmamahabane, Ventersburg, Free State in 1953. Raised by a family of teachers, his love for books began at an early age. In 1969 while he was studying towards his Teacher’s Diploma at Tshiya Teachers Training College, in QwaQwa, he heard about the auditions of Mopheme, a 19-episode Sesotho TV serial drama, which confirmed his reputation as the finest Sesotho-speaking actor on local television and won him The Star Tonight Awards in the category of Best Actor in 1990s.

== Acting and radio drama career ==
As a 24-year-old school teacher in Heilbron, a small farming town in the Free State,he penned his first radio drama serial in 1977. It was broadcast on Radio Sesotho (Lesedi FM) and won him first prize of R200 during a radio drama competition. He has published books like ‘Ke etse Jwang’? (Drama), which won first prize in the Shutter & Shooter Drama competitions in the 90's, as well as ‘Dinyane La Tshepe Sebalamakgulowo,’ which won 2nd prize in the Van Schaik Short Stories Competition, also in the 90's.

== Awards and recognition ==
In 2019 he was awarded with the Lifetime Achievement Award by South African Film and Television Awards (Saftas). The Central University of Technology, Free State conferred him with an Honorary Doctorate in Communication and Language Practice to Khotso Nkhatho at the class of 2020 Virtual graduation ceremony.
