= Group Areas Act =

South African laws codifying racial segregation

Group Areas Act, 1950

Parliament of South Africa
- Long title: Act to provide for the establishment of group areas, for the control of the acquisition of immovable property and the occupation of land and premises, and for matters incidental thereto.
- Citation: Act No. 41 of 1950
- Enacted by: Parliament of South Africa
- Commenced: 30 March 1951 (Cape, Transvaal, Natal); 31 October 1952 (O.F.S.)
- Repealed: 1 November 1957
- Administered by: Minister of the Interior

Legislative history
- Bill title: 250009665
- Passed: 2785x

Repealed by
- Group Areas Act, 1991
- Status: Repealed

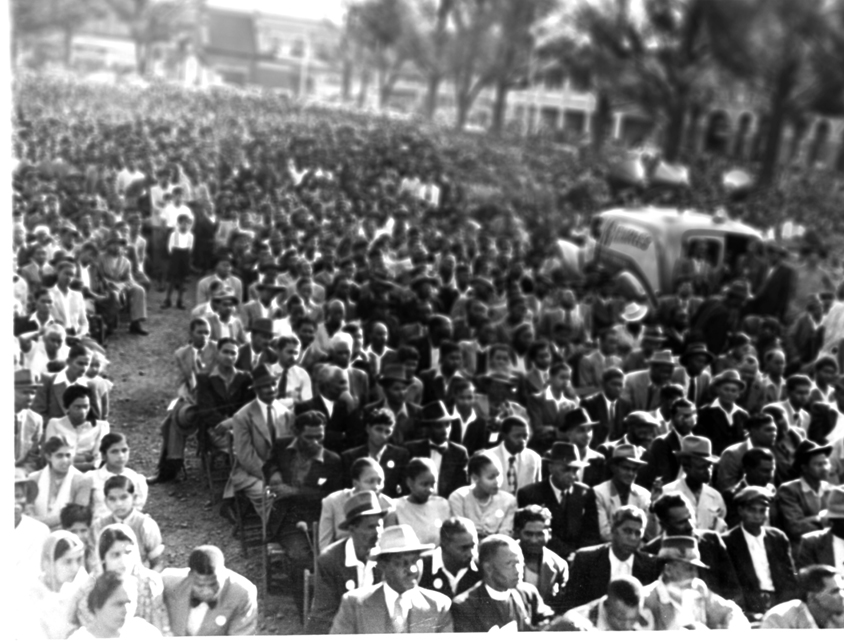
Mass protest at Durban on 28 May 1945 against the Group Areas Bill and the Suppression of Communism Bill attended by over 20,000. The meeting was jointly organised by the African National Congress, Natal Indian Congress, and the Coloured People Organisation.

Group Areas Act, 1991

Parliament of South Africa
- Long title: Act to consolidate the law relating to the establishment of group areas, the control of the acquisition of immovable property and the occupation of land and premises and matters incidental thereto.
- Citation: Act No. 77 of 1957
- Enacted by: Parliament of South Africa
- Royal assent: 24 June 1957
- Commenced: 1 November 1957
- Repealed: 26 October 1966
- Administered by: Minister of the Interior

Repeals
- Group Areas Act, 1950

Repealed by
- Group Areas Act, 1991
- Status: Repealed

Group Areas Act, 1966

Parliament of South Africa
- Long title: Act to consolidate the law relating to the establishment of group areas, the control of the acquisition of immovable property and the occupation of land and premises, and matters incidental thereto.
- Citation: Act No. 36 of 1966
- Enacted by: Parliament of South Africa
- Assented to: 5 October 1966
- Commenced: 26 October 1966
- Repealed: 30 June 1991
- Administered by: Minister of Planning

Repeals
- Group Areas Act, 1957

Repealed by
- Abolition of Racially Based Land Measures Act, 1991
- Status: Repealed

Group Areas Act was the title of three acts of the Parliament of South Africa enacted under the National Party-led government of South Africa in 1950. The acts assigned racial groups to different residential and business sections in urban areas in a system of urban apartheid. An effect of the law was to exclude people of colour from living in the most developed areas, which were restricted to Whites (e.g. Sea Point, Claremont). It required many people of colour to commute large distances from their homes to be able to work. The law led to people of colour being forcibly removed from living in the "wrong areas" where they were settled in their family, extended family cultural and / or religious groups. Despite numbering in the majority at the time, people of colour were forced into smaller lands (e.g., Tongaat, Grassy Park) to live in, than compared to the white minority. Pass Laws required people of colour to carry pass books and later "reference books", similar to passports, to enter the "white" parts of the country.

The first Group Areas Act, the Population Registration Act, 1950 was promulgated on 7 July 1950, and it was implemented over a period of several years. It was amended by Parliament in 1952, 1955 (twice), 1956 and 1957. Later in 1957, it was repealed and re-enacted in consolidated form as the Group Areas Act, 1957, which was amended in 1961, 1962, and 1965. In 1966, that version was, in turn, repealed and re-enacted as the Group Areas Act, 1966, which was amended in 1969, 1972, 1974, 1975, 1977, 1978, 1979, 1982, and 1984. It was repealed, along with many other discriminatory laws, on 30 June 1991 by the Abolition of Racially Based Land Measures Act, 1991.

== Background ==
After the 1948 general election, D.F. Malan's administration commenced its policy of racial segregation known as apartheid in South Africa. The government hoped to achieve this through "separate development" of the races and this entailed passing laws that would ensure a distinction on social, economic, political and, in the case of the Group Areas Act, geographical lines. The Group Areas Act may be regarded as an extension of the Asiatic Land Tenure Act, 1946.

== Provisions ==
The Act empowered the Governor-General to declare certain geographical areas to be for the exclusive occupation of specific racial groups. In particular the statute identified four such racial groups: whites, coloureds, indians, and natives. This authority was exercised on the advice of the Minister of the Interior and the Group Areas Board.

Once an area had been designated for sole occupation by certain racial groups, the proclamation would not become legally effective for at least one year. Once this time had expired, it became a criminal offence to remain in occupation of property in that area with the punishment potentially being a fine and two years' imprisonment.

The Act also applied to businesses with racial designation being applied on the basis of the individuals who held a controlling interest in the company.

== Impact ==
The Act became an effective tool in the separate development of races in South Africa. It also granted the Minister of the Interior a mandate to forcibly remove non-whites from valuable pieces of land so that they could become white settlements.

One of the most famous uses of the Group Areas Act was the destruction of Sophiatown, a suburb of Johannesburg. On 9 February 1955, 2,000 policemen began removing residents to Meadowlands, Soweto and erected a new white-only area called Triomf (Victory).

Nelson Mandela said of the Act in his book, Long Walk to Freedom:

"the Groups Areas Act was the foundation of residential apartheid. Under its regulations, each racial group could own land, occupy premises, and trade only in its own separate area. Indians could henceforth only live in Indian areas, Africans in African, Coloureds in Coloured. If whites wanted the land or houses of the other groups, they could simply declare that land a white area and take them"

== See also ==
- Apartheid laws
