= Natives Land Act, 1913 =

1913 South African law on land acquisition

Parliament of South Africa
- Long title: Act to make further provision as to the purchase and leasing of Land by Natives and other Persons in the several parts of the Union and for other purposes in connection with the ownership and occupation of Land by Natives and other Persons.
- Citation: Act No. 27 of 1913
- Enacted by: Parliament of South Africa
- Royal assent: 16 June 1913
- Commenced: 19 June 1913
- Repealed: 30 June 1991
- Administered by: Minister of Native Affairs

Repealed by
- Abolition of Racially Based Land Measures Act, 1991

Related legislation
- Native Trust and Land Act, 1936
- Status: Repealed

The Natives Land Act, 1913 (subsequently renamed Bantu Land Act, 1913 and Black Land Act, 1913; Act No. 27 of 1913) was an Act of the Parliament of South Africa that was aimed at regulating the acquisition of land. It largely prohibited the sale of land from whites to blacks and vice-versa.

Economic interests, political influence and racial prejudices were main contributors to the introduction of the Natives Land Act. According to the Encyclopædia Britannica: "The Natives' Land Act of 1913 defined less than one-tenth of South Africa as Black "reserves" and prohibited any purchase or lease of land by Blacks outside the reserves. The law also restricted the terms of tenure under which Blacks could live on white-owned farms."

== Historical context ==
The late 19th and early 20th centuries observed a junction of colonial imperialism, economic transformation and a rise in racially divisive ideals. As European powers expanded their territories into Africa the social identities of these regions were transformed. In 1853, the British Cape Colony introduced a colourblind electoral franchise but in 1892 Cecil Rhodes got the Franchise and Ballot Act passed which disenfranchised many black Africans by tripling the wealth requirement to vote. In 1894, the Glen Grey Act was passed, beginning the segregation of races in South Africa through legislation.

With the surplus of natural resources, including gold and diamonds, there was a rush to assert dominance in all regions of Africa. South Africa was introduced to a surplus of mainly British and Dutch immigrants who tried to implement their own ideologies upon the indigenous people of this land. Tensions began to grow between the colonisers and the indigenous groups throughout the 19th century which ultimately lead to the introduction of the Natives Land Act in 1913. Through this act, the colonisers were able to profit majorly. The natural resources existing within the indigenous land, and the ability to use indigenous workers generated a lot of wealth.

The Natives Land Act is remembered in South African history as one step towards the institutional discrimination and injustice of the Apartheid era and for underlying geographic segregation of races that still remains. Other policies that followed the Natives Land Act include prohibition of interracial marriage, restricted access to many white-only spaces, creation of different public facilities including bathrooms, water fountains, parks and beaches. Different from other discriminatory systems, the apartheid system in South Africa was a white minority, discriminating against an indigenous, black majority. Being the minority group, the apartheid government had to ensure they kept control of their power. The way the apartheid government was able to do this was through only allowing white people to vote and hold government positions, essentially making it impossible for them to be overthrown no matter how unjustly they acted.

== Overview ==
The Natives Land Act of 1913 was the first major piece of segregation legislation passed by the Union Parliament. It was repealed in 1991. The act decreed that blacks were not allowed to buy land from whites and vice versa. Exceptions had to be approved by the Governor-General. The black areas left initially totalled around 7% of the entire land mass of the Union, which was later expanded to 13%.

The Act further prohibited the practice of serfdom or sharecropping. It also protected existing agreements or arrangement of land hired or leased by both parties.

This land was in "native reserve" areas, which meant it was under "communal" tenure vested in African chiefs: it could not be bought, sold or used as surety. Outside such areas, perhaps of even greater significance for black farming was that the Act forbade black tenant farming on white-owned land. Since so many black farmers were sharecroppers or labour tenants that had a devastating effect, but its full implementation was not immediate. The Act strengthened the chiefs, who were part of the state administration, but it forced many blacks in the "white" areas into wage labour.

The Act, aimed at addressing issues related to serfdom or sharecropping, which had profound implications for indigenous people. It specifically prohibited these practices, which had been the primary sources of employment for the indigenous population. Additionally, the legislation safeguarded existing agreements regarding land leased by both parties, particularly in designated "native reserve" areas. In these areas, land, held under communal tenure vested in chiefs, could neither be bought nor sold, nor used as collateral. However, the impact extended beyond the designated reserve areas. The Act also prohibited black tenant farming on white-owned land, a move that significantly affected many black farmers who were sharecroppers or labour tenants. The full implementation of these restrictions was not immediate, but when enforced, it compelled numerous black individuals living in "white" areas into wage labour. Notably, before the Natives Land Act took effect, much of the white-owned land was occupied by the indigenous people engaging in share-cropping arrangements. Indigenous individuals would rent the land for cultivation, sharing the resulting crops with the landowners. This mutually beneficial system drastically changed after the implementation of the Act, as sharecropping and renting of white-owned land by indigenous people were banned. Instead of a partner-ship, the indigenous farmers had to work for their "white-master". Consequently, this prohibition created severe challenges for the indigenous population, rendering them unable to work on the land they had previously cultivated. Compounded by the forced relocation into poorly planned homelands and townships allocated strictly for indigenous groups, the Act initiated a cycle of lasting poverty. The government's relocation efforts, coupled with the inability for the indigenous to find work and provide for themselves, led to a rapid increase in socio-economic issues within these communities.

Discrimination had been prevalent prior to the Natives Land act and majority of the damage was done prior to the act being enforced. The dispossession of indigenous people in this land started when the European colonists first entered the land and started to expand their territory. They used many tactics such as annexation, warfare and the purchase of land. Oftentimes, indigenous leaders would accept these annexations and purchases because they realized they were militarily outnumbered and warfare would not be beneficial to either party. Injustices against indigenous groups were prevalent in years prior, however 1913 served as a catalyst for the institutional and more intense discrimination that followed.

== Content of the Act ==
The following is a brief description of the sections of the Natives Land Act:

Section 1

Defines that land outside the scheduled native areas, except by approval of the Governor-General, and until parliament acts on the commission's report, no Black African could purchase, hire or acquire land etc. other than from another Black African nor could a person who wasn't a Black African purchase, hire or acquire land, etc. from a Black African. This also applied to land within native areas and any exceptions made by the Governor-general was to be tabled in both houses of parliament. All agreement and transactions were null and void ab initio.

Section 2

Defines the appointment, by the Governor-General, of a commission after the commencement of the Act, that would inquire and report on areas where Black African shall not be permitted to acquire or hire land or have interests in land and likewise set aside areas where non-Black Africans were not permitted to acquire or hire land or have interests in land. The reports would include boundaries and maps. The commission had two years to report back to parliament.

Section 3

Defines the make-up of the commission as no less than five people with the ability to appoint persons to assist them and set procedures. Final reports and recommendations were considered accepted if the majority of the commission agreed with the decision. Defines the right of the commission or its representatives to enter any land, obtain any document needed, without fee or charge in order to carry out its inquires.

Section 4

Defines the ability of the Governor-General to use money allocated by parliament, to acquire any land or interest in land as described in section 2 and defines the laws to be used to expropriate land.

Section 5

Defines the fines or imprisonment for a person who attempted to purchase, sale, hire or lease land, or any agreement or transaction which is in contravention of the Act. Applied to companies and corporations to with the directors, managers, and corporate secretary's liable for prosecution and punishment.

Section 6

Defines that the Act will be used in addition to other laws governing Black African land ownership but if in conflict, it defined when this Act would supersede other laws.

Section 7

Defines what provisions of Orange Free State Law Book and Law No. 4 of 1895 remain in force as well as article twenty of Law No. 4 of 1895 of the Orange Free State.

Section 8

Defines when and where the Acts does not affect current laws of land purchase, sale and transfer, ownership and mortgages. Made provisions for the Cape Province where a non-white person could be a registered voter based on land ownership.

Section 9

Defines the right of the Governor-general to create regulations to manage sanitation for native areas not managed by a local authority.

Section 10

Defined the meanings of common words within the Act. Special emphasis was given to defining the meaning of a who is a Black African farm labourer and who isn't, something the former would have to prove himself if in court. Other emphasis was given to defining who is a person who hires land in relation to the Act.

Section 11

Defined the name of the Act.

== Social and economic impact ==
The land act had set aside 13% of agricultural land for the indigenous people. However, initially they were only given about 7%. It took them 23 years of fighting to receive the other 6%. Prior to the act, the indigenous people of South Africa had owned majority of the farmland which was annexed, bought or handed over to the white colonists. However the indigenous remained the majority of the population of South Africa whilst only being able to live in 7-13% of the land. This act was an assertion of power within the new government, and policies were formulated to ensure the new government wasn't overthrown. The main policy being only white people could vote or hold government positions and the lack of a strong education system for the indigenous. These injustices trapped the indigenous living in South Africa in a socio-economic crisis. The government claimed that the aim of the Natives Land Act was to control and redistribute farmland in South Africa in hope to remove poverty and benefit all. Despite this claim, it resulted in a massive increase of poverty for indigenous peoples. Prior to the implementation of the act there were relatively low rates of poverty for everyone in South Africa. However, with the dispossession of land combined with the forbidding of share cropping and free leasing/selling of land, the act was beginning of a long history of poverty for the indigenous.

According to the paragraph 'The impact of the Land Act', "Perhaps the most visible impact of the Act was that it denied Africans access to land which they owned or had been leasing from White farmers." The Natives Land Act not only stole land but almost all their possessions including cattle, crops and their homes. Indigenous people were also forced into becoming labourers for the European settlers and were treated poorly and were not compensated well. The land allocated for indigenous communities was impoverished and separated from the white-owned land. This caused many issues for indigenous people, since they had to travel far for work and weren't being paid enough to support their families. Furthermore, indigenous children were not required to get an education unlike the white children. When indigenous children did pursue education they were forced into schools that were worse and unable to provide the same opportunities as the white schools had. This cycle made it impossible for indigenous people to escape the poverty found in their communities. Indigenous groups were subject to use different facilities than the white people and had restricted access to resources. They were also required to carry around an internal passport which would be checked by law enforcement further restricting their rights and ability to move around within South Africa. As time progressed the indigenous communities got very overpopulated creating crowded slums with poor nutrition, many diseases and little healthcare.

== Responses ==
The opposition to the Act was modest but vocal. John Dube used his newspaper to generate international recognition and support. As president of what would become the African National Congress, he supported whites like William Cullen Wilcox, who had created the Zululand Industrial Improvement Company. That had led to them supplying land to thousands of black people in Natal. Dube was one of six people who were sent to Britain to try to overturn the law once it came into force in South Africa.

A viewpoint somewhat irreconcilable with the view expressed in the preceding paragraph, is that expressed in the paragraph 'Responses to the Land Act ' in this South African History Online reference: "The Natives Land Act sparked fierce opposition particularly by Black African people..." The paragraph goes on to outline criticism of the Act, followed by organised protests: "Between 28 February and 26 April 1913 African leaders continued criticism of the Land Bill in columns of newspapers. However, this changed dramatically after the first reading of the bill on 25 February. Protest meetings were organised in various parts of the country. On 9 May the first major protest meeting was organised by the SANNC at the Masonic Hall in St. James, Cape Town." These protests were unsuccessful in generating any change in policies.

Furthermore, there was the deputation made to the then Minister of Justice of South Africa, Jacobus Wilhelmus Sauer: "Also in May 1913 the SANNC sent a deputation to Jacobus Wilhelmus Sauer to persuade him to not proceed with the bill which would make Africans squatters and render them homeless."

Sol Plaatje traveled to Britain with the SANNC (later the African National Congress) to protest against the Natives Land Act but to no avail. He collected transcripts of court deliberations on the Natives Land Act and testimonies from those directly subject to the act in the 1916 Book Native Life in South Africa.

In the aftermath of the promulgation of the Natives Land Act of 1913, a long struggle for land restitution and reform was endured by indigenous communities. Through the Abolition of Racially Based Land Measures Act of 1991 and the 1994 Restitution of Land Act of 1994, small progress was gained. These acts addressed 3 facets of the injustices; land redistribution, land restitution and tenure reform. Indigenous groups were able to file claims for land that was stolen from their ancestors and were eligible to receive compensation or restitution. In 1994, the African National Congress announced they aspired to have 30% of land returned by 2014. A BBC article published in 2018 estimates that only 10% of the farm land had been returned to the indigenous people. This discrepancy in aspiration and actuality shows the persistent hurdles experienced in post-apartheid South Africa.

== Commemorations ==
The land act of 1913 was eventually repealed in 1991. The Abolition of Racially Based Land Measures Act of 1991 initiated change for indigenous people. This act planned to amend the laws and restrictions placed on indigenous people and their ability to purchase, rent or acquire land. It also implemented standards for residential communities and rationalized or phased out racially based institutions and regulatory systems. Although poverty is still very prominent, in years after the abolition, rights and quality of life have slowly got better for members of the affected communities.

In 2013, the South African Government held a centenary ceremony to remember the Natives Land act of 1913. This ceremony served as a reflection upon how horrible the act was and all the damage it caused for indigenous people for the last 100 years. Through this reflection, citizens of South Africa were able to acknowledge the struggles still experienced due to the act and hopefully help generate further reform.

== Political ironies ==
Much political irony surrounded the Act:

- The minister at the time of its introduction, J. W. Sauer, was a Cape Liberal who opposed disenfranchisement of blacks. He, however, advocated for "separate residential areas for Whites and Natives" in the Parliamentary debate on the bill.
- John Tengo Jabavu, a prominent "educated African" welcomed the Act, but John X. Merriman stated that the bill was a "stringent, Draconian, and violent law"; additionally, William Schreiner opposed the Act on principle.

== See also ==
- Land reform in South Africa
- Apartheid legislation

== Bibliography ==
Mukherjee, Arun P. (January 1990). "Whose post-colonialism and whose postmodernism?". World Literature Written in English. 30 (2): 1–9. doi:10.1080/17449859008589127. ISSN 0093-1705. L.M. Thompson, A History of South Africa
