= Native Trust and Land Act, 1936 =

South African antecedent Apartheid legislation

Parliament of South Africa
- Long title: Act to provide for the establishment of a South African Native Trust and to define its purposes; to make further provision as to the acquisition and occupation of land by natives and other persons; to amend Act No. 27 of 1913; and to provide for other incidental matters.
- Citation: Act No. 18 of 1936
- Enacted by: Parliament of South Africa
- Royal assent: 19 June 1936
- Commenced: 31 August 1936
- Repealed: 30 June 1991
- Administered by: Minister of Native Affairs

Repealed by
- Abolition of Racially Based Land Measures Act, 1991

Related legislation
- Natives Land Act, 1913
- Status: Repealed

The Native Trust and Land Act, 1936 (Act No. 18 of 1936; subsequently renamed the Bantu Trust and Land Act, 1936 and the Development Trust and Land Act, 1936) in South Africa passed a law that served as the reorganisation of its agricultural structures, thus formalising the separation of white and black rural areas. This followed the recommendations of the Beaumont Commission in.

This ordinance stipulated that the reserve land, which the black population in the Natives Land Act, 1913 had been allocated to 7.13% (9,709,586 acres (3,929,330 ha)) of the total land, be enlarged to approximately 13.6% of the total area of then South Africa. This value was not reached and remained so unfulfilled until the 1980s. As late as 1972, the government purchased 1,146,451 acres to meet this requirement in the homelands.

As the black population at this time accounted for about 61% of the general population, this area ratio was very small. During the Great Depression, damage to agricultural land through erosion and overgrazing played a relevant role in the preparation of the Act. At the same time, the rights of the black people were as tenant farmers restricted to white owners. From then on, blacks were only allowed to live on farms, which were owned by whites, and the black employees worked on them.

The Act established the South African Native Trust (SANT) for the purpose of administering "the settlement, support, benefit, and material welfare of the natives of the Union". The SANT purchased all reserve land not owned by the State, and controlled all aspects of administered land for agricultural purposes.

This selling pressure caused by the Act forced many blacks to seek work in salaried employment outside of their family and tribal tradition rooted in residential areas. Destinations of these migrations were the large farms of the whites and the cities, preferably industrial urban centres.

== Repeal ==
The act was repealed by the Abolition of Racially Based Land Measures Act, 1991 on 30 June 1991.

== See also ==
- Category:Apartheid laws in South Africa
- Apartheid in South Africa
- Tomlinson Report (South Africa)
