= 1963 in South Africa =

- Decades: 1940s; 1950s; 1960s; 1970s; 1980s
- See also: List of years in South Africa

The following lists events that happened during 1963 in South Africa.

== Incumbents ==
- State President: Charles Robberts Swart.
- Prime Minister: Hendrik Verwoerd.
- Chief Justice: Lucas Cornelius Steyn.

== Events ==
July

- 2 – Cameroon closes its airports and harbours to both Portugal and South Africa.
- 11 – Lionel Bernstein, Denis Goldberg, Arthur Goldreich, Bob Hepple, Abdulhay Jassat, Ahmed Kathrada, Govan Mbeki, Raymond Mhlaba, Andrew Mlangeni, Moosa Moolla, Elias Motsoaledi, Walter Sisulu and Harold Wolpe, all senior African National Congress members, are arrested at Liliesleaf Farm in Rivonia, Johannesburg by South African Police.
- Neville Alexander is arrested along with a number of National Liberation Front members.

August

- 7 – United Nations Security Council Resolution 181 is passed, calling for a voluntary arms embargo of South Africa.
- 11 – Four of the defendants who had been arrested on 11 July, at the Liliesleaf Farm near Johannesburg, were able to escape their South African jail after a bribe was promised to their guard by the ANC. Harold Wolpe and Arthur Goldreich, who were both white, were confined at Johannesburg's Marshall Square Police Station, in the same cell with Indian South Africans Abdulhay Jassat and Moosa Moolla, separate from the black South African defendants. Their white guard, Johannes Greeff, served three years of a six-year sentence, and later received 2,000 African pounds. Wolpe and Goldreich would elude a nationwide search and, "disguised as priests", make it to Swaziland (which was surrounded by South Africa), and on 8 September, would charter a plane to fly to Tanganyika.
- 20 – The Israeli government informs the United Nations Special Committee on Apartheid that it has taken all necessary steps to ensure that no arms, ammunition, or strategic materials are exported from Israel to South Africa in any form, directly or indirectly.
- 20 – Mauritius bars South Africa and Portugal from her sea- and airports.

October

- 6 – The Rivonia Trial begins.

Unknown date

- Dorothy Nyembe is arrested for furthering the objectives of the banned African National Congress and is sentenced to 3 years in prison.

== Births ==
- 1 January – Sello Twala, recording artist, record producer & businessman.
- 14 February – Ken Oosterbroek, photojournalist. (d. 1994)
- 12 May – Gavin Hood, filmmaker, director, screenwriter, producer and actor.
- 23 May – Ayanda Dlodlo, national minister.
- 23 May – Allister Coetzee, Springboks coach.
- 26 May – Musetta Vander, actress.
- 6 July – Robert McBride, political activist and convicted murderer.
- 20 August – Rudolf Straeuli, former rugby player & Springboks coach.
- 30 September – Maite Nkoana-Mashabane, politician, national minister.
- 5 December – Shane McGregor, football player.
- 13 December – Jake White, Springbok rugby coach.
- 13 December – Tina Joemat-Pettersson, politician. (d. 2023)
- 22 December – Brian McMillan, cricketer.

== Deaths ==
- 5 September – Looksmart Ngudle, politician, (b. 1922)
- 17 September – Sailor Malan, Second World War fighter pilot. (b. 1910)
- 28 September – Marie Linde, novelist (b. 1894)
- 25 October – Z. D. Mangoaela, Basotho folklorist and writer (b. 1883)

== Railways ==
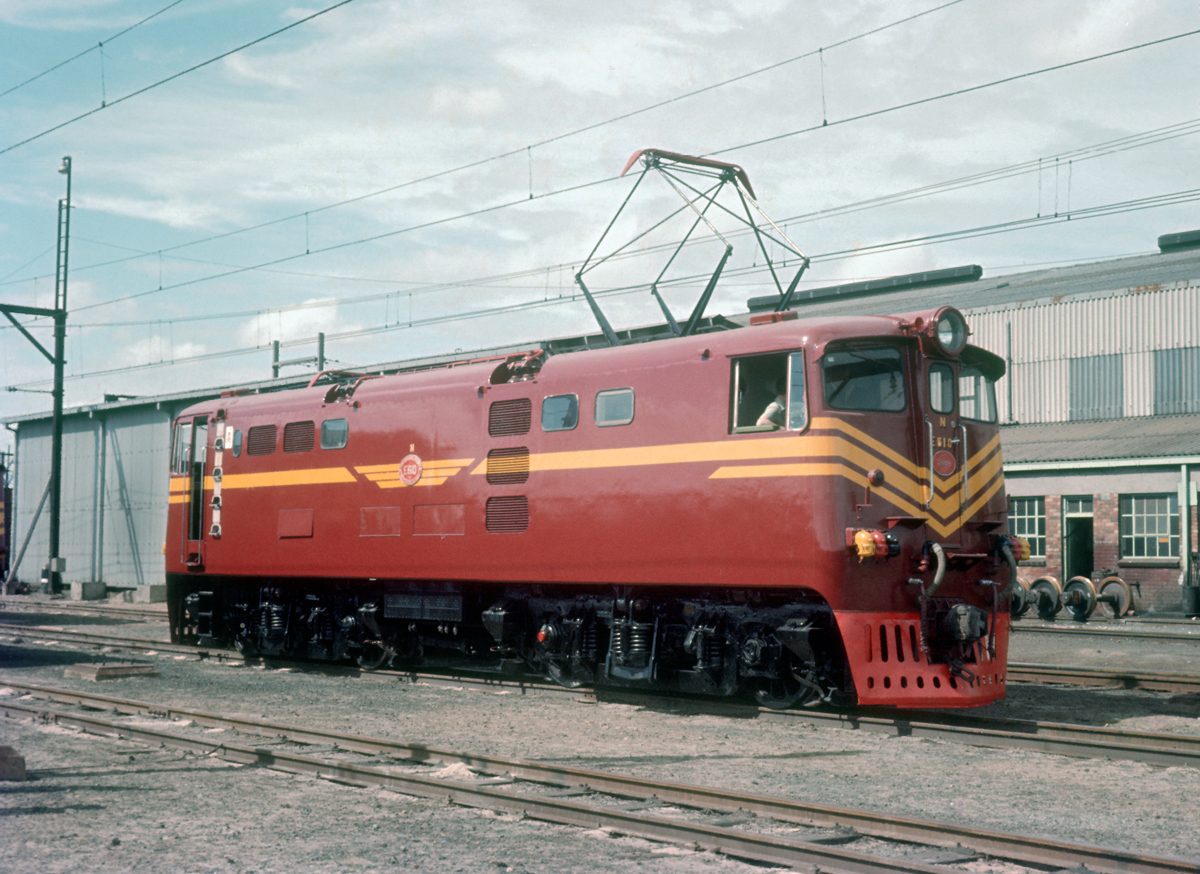
Class 5E1, Series 2

=== Locomotives ===
- The South African Railways places the first of 130 Class 5E1, Series 2 electric locomotives in mainline service. These are the first electric locomotives to be built in South Africa in quantity.

== Sports ==
- Papwa Sewgolum, an Indian golfer, wins the Natal Open tournament.
