= Joe Modise =

South African politician (1929–2001)

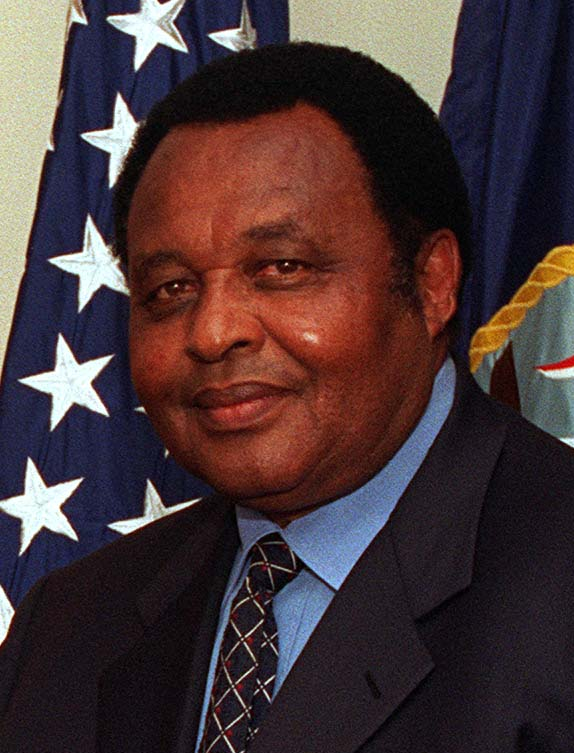
- Modise in 1997

South African Minister of Defence
- In office 11 May 1994 – 17 June 1996
- President: Nelson Mandela
- Deputy: Ronnie Kasrils
- Preceded by: Kobie Coetsee
- Succeeded by: Mosiuoa Lekota

Commander-in-Chief of Umkhonto weSizwe
- In office July 1963 – May 1994
- Preceded by: Raymond Mhlaba
- Succeeded by: Position Disbanded (Note: uMkhonto we Sizwe was integrated into the South African National Defence Force (SANDF) in 1994)

Personal details
- Born: 23 May 1929 Doornfontein, South Africa
- Died: 26 November 2001 (aged 72) Centurion, South Africa
- Resting place: Westpark Cemetery, Johannesburg
- Party: African National Congress
- Spouse(s): Eva Modise; Jackie Sedibe
- Occupation: Co-founder and Commander in Chief of Umkhonto we Sizwe (MK)
- Profession: Guerilla fighter, politician
- Nickname(s): "JM", "Joe"

Military service
- Allegiance: uMkhonto we Sizwe (MK)
- Years of service: 1961–1990
- Rank: Commander in Chief
- Awards: Unitas (Unity) Medal Service Medal

Johannes "Joe" Modise (23 May 1929 – 26 November 2001) was a South African politician and anti-apartheid activist. He helped founded uMkhonto we Sizwe, the paramilitary wing of the African National Congress, and was its longest serving Commander in Chief, deputised at different points in time by Joe Slovo and Chris Hani. Modise headed MK for a 25-year period, from 1965 to 1990. He served as South Africa's first black Minister of Defence from 1994 to 1999 and led the formation of the post-independence defence force.

As a PUTCO bus driver from Sophiatown, Gauteng, he became interested in the struggle against apartheid at an early age. He at first chose only non-violent means, being arrested with Nelson Mandela and 154 others and tried for treason. All were acquitted. In the 1960s, the South African government were using increasingly violent means to suppress anti-Apartheid activists, and Modise became a guerrilla fighter. He organized resistance groups and trained many other guerrilla fighters. Modise became Commander in Chief of Umkhonto we Sizwe ("MK") following the Rivonia Trial during which other MK high command members such as Nelson Mandela, Govan Mbeki, Walter Sisulu, Dennis Goldberg, Ahmed Kathrada, Raymond Mhlaba, Andrew Mlangeni and Elias Motsoaledi's were sentenced to life imprisonment.

By 1990, Modise and other representatives of the African National Congress met with the white government. When Mandela was elected president in 1994, he chose Modise as his Defense Minister. Modise was charged with integrating the many sections of guerrilla fighters into the new South African National Defence Force (SANDF).

== Early life and education ==
An African of Tswana descent, Modise or Joe (or JM), as he is known to family, friends and comrades, was born in Doornfontein, Johannesburg, on 23 May 1929. He was the only child of Miriam and Ezekiel Modise. His father worked as a sweeper in a factory and his mother was a domestic worker in a white family.

Modise completed his Junior Certificate at the Fred Clark Memorial School in Nance Field. He had to leave school in order to work and contribute to his family's income. His parents impressed the importance of education on the young Modise and, consequently, he obtained his matric certificate through private study. His first job was as a driver for various companies.

Contrary to apartheid regime-led claims and conspiracy theories; Modise was never a member of the Alexandra Township gang, the Spoilers. Instead he spent his time away from work (as a PUTCO bus driver) working for the African National Congress Youth League (ANCYL). Modise joined the ANCYL in about 1947 in Newclare and became one of the organisation's organisers. When the Strijdom government declared Sophiatown a White area the residents who were threatened by the demolition of their homes and political organisations, such as the African National Congress (ANC), organised themselves in the Western Areas Protest Committee. Modise was very involved in the one-day work stoppage in 1955. His political activities as an organiser against the Sophiatown removals led to his first arrest in 1954. He was also actively involved in the political campaigns against the introduction of Bantu Education in 1953.

== Career ==
=== Freedom Charter Movement and the founding of Umkhonto we Sizwe (MK) ===
Modise was one of the 156 people whom the South African state identified as leading figures in the Freedom Charter movement. They were charged with treason. The government claimed that they were working systematically towards the overthrow of the South African state. Modise was amongst the 73 trialists against whom charges were dropped.

By 1960 many of the acts of resistance were directed against the implementation of the Pass Laws. On 21 March 1960 the Pan Africanist Congress of Azania (PAC) organised an anti-pass campaign. The ANC and the PAC were banned in the wake of the brutal crushing of the campaign by the South African police.

Modise was part of the group that included his long-time friend Nelson Mandela, Wilton Mkwayi, Ronnie Kasrils, Govan Mbeki, Walter Sisulu, Denis Goldberg, Ahmed Kathrada, Raymond Mhlaba, Andrew Mlangeni, Elias Motsoaledi and others who founded Umkhonto we Sizwe (MK). After warning the South African government in June 1961 of its intent to resist further acts of terror if the government did not take steps toward constitutional reform and increase political rights, MK launched its first attacks against government installations in Johannesburg, Port Elizabeth and Durban on 16 December 1961. In January 1962, Nelson Mandela left South Africa for military training while most of the other MK members continued underground activities inside the country with meeting being held at Liliesleaf Farm in Rivonia. As soon as ties with other countries had been established, Modise played a key role in recruiting people for Umkhonto we Sizwe (MK) and arranging for them to leave the country for military training. As of 1962 he was instructed to leave his job as a driver to work as an organiser for MK on a full-time basis.

On 11 July 1963, 19 ANC and MK leaders, including Arthur Goldreich and Walter Sisulu, were arrested at Liliesleaf Farm, Rivonia. Modise and other key leaders such as Oliver Tambo, Moses Kotane were not at the farm at the time of the arrests. The Rivonia trail, resulted in MK high command members Nelson Mandela, Govan Mbeki, Walter Sisulu, Dennis Goldberg, Ahmed Kathrada, Raymond Mhlaba, Andrew Mlangeni and Elias Motsoaledi's being sentenced to life imprisonment. The charge sheet at the trial lists 193 acts of sabotage. Wilton Mkwayi, head of MK at the time, escaped during trial.

=== Building MK ===
When the USSR opened an embassy in Dar es Salaam, Tanzania, in 1962, more direct links between the Soviets and the ANC were cemented. The embassy, formally through the Soviet Afro-Asian Solidarity Committee, invited Oliver Tambo in December 1962 to visit the Soviet Union for a period of rest. Tambo went to the country in March 1963, accompanied by Moses Kotane and they presented an overview of events in South Africa, and met with the Communist Party of the Soviet Union (CPSU). On 5 April 1963 Tambo and Kotane had talks with Ponomarev, which was the beginning of a long relationship between the men and during the meeting, parties set out radical plans for the overthrow of the apartheid regime, using armed and political struggle. Tambo also motivated the urgent need to train ANC cadres in the Soviet Union.

Tambo's request for military training was approved by the Soviet government, and in the summer of 1963 two groups of 20 cadres arrived in Moscow to begin studies at the Northern Training Centre. The first group arrived in November 1963, and they were joined by a larger group that included Modise (who had taken name the guerrilla name Thabo More) and Moses Mabhida, who was recalled from the World Federation of Trade Unions (WFTU) headquarters in Prague. The recruits underwent training in guerrilla warfare, military strategy and tactics, topography, drilling and the use of firearms. Because the number of recruits had increased significantly, training was moved to a larger facility in the city of Odesa in Ukraine. Between 1963 and 1965, 328 cadres were trained in Odessa including Chris Hani who arrived in 1964. Other leaders of the ANC and SACP also underwent aspects of military training, including Moses Kotane, Duma Nokwe, Joe Slovo and Ambrose Makiwane.

Following his training, MK's executive determined that Modise should undergo further military training in order to lead its military personnel. He was also charged with the additional responsibility of the procurement of arms. Modise's training took him to the former Soviet Union, the former Czechoslovakia, Cuba and Vietnam. In 1964 he returned to Tanzania, from where he was involved in the re-organisation of MK and its training programmes and began a lifelong commitment to the struggle in which he established MK bases in Tanzania, Angola and Zambia. Training in the Soviet Union, especially for MK's staff officers continued in the USSR and Tambo and Modise led another delegation to the USSR in August 1965 with the aim of expanding these programmes.

=== Commander-in-Chief of Umkhonto we Sizwe ===
Modise was appointed Commander in Chief of Umkhonto we Sizwe (MK) in 1965. In the same year, he was also appointed to the National Executive Committee of the ANC, an explicitly political office. Between 1965 and 1990, he led every tactical and strategic action by the MK including the acts of sabotage, bombings and landmine campaigns.

Between 1965 and 1996 the leadership group moved to Morogoro, which became ANC HQ, with MK becoming the ANC's military wing. In 1967, OR Tambo became Acting President, after the death of Chief Albert Luthuli. The ANC's secretary-general was Duma Nokwe, Moses Kotane filled the post of treasurer, and modise was commander in chief of MK. The primary task before them was the reorganisation of the ANC's severely disrupted structures. As Commander in Chief of MK, Modise together with Dumiso Dabengwa of Zimbabwe People's Revolutionary Army (ZAPU, ZIPRA) led the Wankie Sipolilo Campaign. The "Luthuli Detachment" comprising ANC and ZAPU guerrillas crossed the Zambezi river into the then Rhodesia and engaged joint Smith-Vorster troops during the infamous battles. Under Modise's command, the troops who included Chris Hani (Commissar), Mavuso Msimang (MK Co-Chief of Communications), Lennox Lagu, Peter Mfene, Douglas Wana, Mbijana, the late Victor Dlamini, Castro, Mashigo (the ANC Chief Representative to Lusaka), Paul Sithole, Desmond, Wilson Msweli, Shooter Makasi, Eric Nduna, Basil February, James April fought raging battles with the enemy which until late 1968.

Tambo and James Chikerema, the head of ZAPU in exile, directed the campaign at the political level, while Modise (MK Commander in Chief), Akim Ndlovu (ZIPRA commander), Archie Sibeko (Zola Zembe, MK Chief of Operations), Dumiso Dabengwa (ZAPU chief of intelligence), Mjojo (General Tshali, MK Chief of Staff), Walter Mavuso (Mavuso Msimang, MK Chief of Communications) and Chris Hani (MK Commissar) assumed responsibility at the military level for personnel, reconnaissance, intelligence and logistics.

The latter involved the acquisition of ammunition and food supplies for the mission, as well as the means to transport them. Intelligence was left to ZAPU, due to their knowledge of the terrain and its people. ZAPU also undertook to conduct an awareness campaign in the area of the proposed operation so as to ensure a good reception for the MK guerillas by local residents. Other ZIPRA cadres who were involved included John Dube and Moffat Hadebe (ZIPRA commanders) as well as Phelekezela Mphoko (former vice-president of Zimbabwe).

=== Morogoro conference ===
In 1969 Chris Hani authored the 'Hani Memorandum' which was strongly critical of the direction of the armed struggle. At the Morogoro Conference later that year, the ANC formed the Revolutionary Council which was chaired by OR Tambo. This was a move intended to reinforce the supremacy of political leadership also ensure that the task of mass mobilisation and underground organisation received the necessary emphasis - to reinforce the links between the armed struggle the mass base and the underground structures of the ANC.

During the conference, Tambo resigned but was unanimously re-elected as deputy president of the ANC. There was also a decision to have new, reduced NEC and Duma Nokwe lost his position as secretary-general to Alfred Nzo and was also removed from the NEC. Modise received a massive vote of confidence and retained his post and title as Head of MK, although OR Tambo as ANC president then took on the title of Commander in Chief.

The military headquarters was dissolved, and Modise was elevated to membership of the newly constituted Revolutionary Council. Separate regional headquarters, also called staff commands, for Zambia and Tanzania were established under their own chiefs of staff. The other major decision of the conference was to open membership of the ANC in exile to people of all races. This went some way towards resolving the anomaly that while membership of MK had been open to people of all races, the ANC had not taken that step. It also facilitated the political integration of MK into the ANC and brought MK back under the ANC's control – the apparent independence of MK and the lack of political control over it had been one of the main complaints of Hani and his fellow signatories.

The conference did not, however, go so far as to allow non-African membership of the ANC's national executive committee. As a compromise solution, a Revolutionary Council with open and non-racial membership was established as a nominal sub-committee of the NEC. In the long run the Morogoro Conference probably strengthened the ANC in exile. Chris Hani himself said that ‘after Morogoro we never looked back’. He said that the ‘Strategy and Tactics' document that emerged from the conference became 'the lodestar of the movement' and that, with the establishment of the Revolutionary Council there was a shift in emphasis away from international solidarity and towards 'building [the] ANC inside South Africa’. Between 1970 and 1975 MK reconsolidated its underground structures. Among others, Chris Hani returned to South Africa.

=== Escalation of MK activity within South Africa ===
On 25 June 1975, the People's Republic of Mozambique was created after a protracted 10-year battle by FRELIMO troops against the Portuguese colonialists in which MK troops participated. On 11 November 1975 the People's Republic of Angola was born and within months, after the defeat of the invading South African army by the Angolan people's armed forces, MK was invited to train its cadres on Angolan soil. Between 1975 and 1976, early MK commanders who were active in the early 1961-64 sabotage campaign were released from Robben Island. Among them are Joe Gqabi, Indres Naidoo, Ismael Ebrahim and Andrew Masondo who re-assimilated into MK under Modise's leadership. Between 1976 and 1978, MK under Modise dramatically increased in operations inside South Africa, including sabotage of railway lines, attacks on police stations and so on.

MK operations temporary went through a hiatus in 1982 after Modise and Cassius Make were captured and jailed in Botswana after they were caught with an assortment of arms. In the process, MK's plans were seized and therefore an order was given to suspend any planned actions. In 1983, the Revolutionary Council was disbanded as the ANC's main operational organ and was replaced by a Politico-Military Council (PMC). The PMC, like the old RC, was to be chaired by ANC president Oliver Tambo, deputised by secretary general Alfred Nzo. Like the RC, it had two main operational arms, one political and one military.

On the political side, the PMC hierarchy consisted of a political committee chaired by Joe Jele, with Mac Maharaj as secretary. The newly created military headquarters was commanded by Modise (Commander in Chief), deputised by Chris Hani, who was also MK political commissar. Third in the military hierarchy was Joe Slovo, who was Chief of Staff. The ANC's security and intelligence organ, Nat, headed by Mzwai Piliso, was also represented on the PMC.

MK, under Modise and Hani's command participated in the 1983 bombing of Church Street, in Pretoria near the South African Air Force Headquarters, resulting in 19 deaths and 217 injuries. During the next 10 years, the people's army conducted a series of bombings the country including the 1985 Amanzimtoti bombing on the Natal South Coast where five civilians were killed and 40 were injured. The attack was conducted by MK cadre, Andrew Sibusiso Zondo who detonated an explosive in a rubbish bin at a shopping centre shortly before Christmas. In a submission to the Truth and Reconciliation Commission (TRC), the ANC stated that Zondo's act, though "understandable" as a response to a recent South African Defence Force raid in Lesotho, was not in line with ANC policy. Zondo was subsequently executed. In the 1986 Durban beach-front bombing, a bomb was detonated in a bar, killing three civilians and injuring 69. Robert McBride received the death penalty for this bombing which became known as the "Magoo's Bar bombing". The subsequent Truth and Reconciliation Committee called the bombing a "gross violation of human rights". McBride received amnesty and became a senior police officer. Other attacks carried out by MK include the 1987 attacks on courts in Johannesburg, Newcastle, a bank in Roodepoort (1988), Ellis Park rugby stadium (car bomb) and several others which resulted in multiple casualties.

Modise continued to expand MK's capabilities by training younger promising guerrillas as executive officers and in 1985, after the ANC's Kabwe conference, General Siphiwe Nyanda went to Moscow with a group including Charles Nqakula and Nosiviwe Mapisa Nqakula to study military combat work. By 1986 there was an intake of 60 South Africans every year. By the latter half of the decade, Modise was asking the Soviets to train MK cadres for taking up positions in a regular army – by now negotiations were envisaged and a political settlement was beginning to be seen as a real possibility. In 1986 ANC members began a three-year course for motorised infantry officers in Perevalnoye, and the next year many were to embark on five-year courses to become helicopter and jet pilots, flight engineers or naval officers.

=== Preparations for a post-apartheid South Africa ===
In 1987, Modise as head of MK requested the assistance of the Cubans at meetings in Lusaka and Harare. These relations were maintained throughout the 1980s. Further talk included the Russians and discussions were held regarding the shape of the expected political settlement in South Africa. The ANC delegation, led by Oliver Tambo, included Modise, Joe Slovo, Alfred Nzo, and Thabo Mbeki. The Cubans were represented by Jorge Risquet, and the Soviets by Anatoly Dobrynin, who had become the replacement for Boris Ponomarey. In May 1990 under Modise's orders, Chris Hani, then Chief of Staff of MK (and Joe Modise's deputy), asked the Cubans to help train officers for the post-apartheid army.

=== Suspension of the armed struggle ===
In an exclusive interview with "The Herald", on Wednesday, 14 March 1990, the ANC military commander, Modise, stated that the organisation could consider the suspension of the armed struggle but not the laying down of arms, to facilitate negotiations.

Upon the release of Nelson Mandela, and the subsequent unbanning of the liberation movements, Modise was one of the advance group of ANC leaders who were tasked with entering into discussions with the National Party (South Africa) government at Groote Schuur. This meeting resulted in the formulation of a document, the Groote Schuur Minute, which prepared the way for the return of exiles and a negotiated an end to the apartheid system.

== In government ==
=== The building of the new South Africa Defence Force (SADF) ===
During 1993 Modise was instrumental in negotiating the integration of officials of the South African Defence Force (SADF) and those of the liberation armies. Apart from this task Modise served on the defence sub-council of the Transitional Executive Council from December 1993 to April 1994. After the first democratic elections in April 1994 President Nelson Mandela appointed him as South Africa's Minister of Defence where together with his comrades General Siphiwe Nyanda (Defence Chief from 1998) and Ronnie Kasrils (deputy minister of defence) gallantly led the integration of the liberation armies and former colonial forces into a new, professional defence force.

In the new South Africa, Modise also founded the Umkhonto we Sizwe Veterans Association and was elected "Life President". Modise's professional contribution to overthrowing apartheid and to establish a new democracy has been recognised. On 22 November 2001 President Thabo Mbeki awarded Modise the country's highest civilian honour, the Order of the Star of South Africa (non-Military), Class 1: Grand Cross (Gold). In addition, numerous roads and human settlements have been named after him.

=== Corruption accusation ===
At the Sereti Commission of inquiry, Gavin Woods made accusations that Joe Modise had benefited from the South African Arms deal. However, upon cross-examination, he failed to provide any evidence of any such benefits. Joe Modise's family has consistently supported all investigations into the arms deal and have challenged anyone to come forward with evidence of any money or any benefits that flowed to Joe Modise or any of his family members. In fact, to date, no investigation or court of law has found any evidence of wrong-doing against Joe Modise, even though there have been numerous allegations levelled against him, and his peers, fellow South African liberation icons and cabinet members at the time, Nelson Mandela, Thabo Mbeki as well as the ANC.

== Death ==
In 2001, Modise died of cancer in Pretoria at the age of 72. He was buried at Westpark Cemetery in Johannesburg, South Africa. He is survived by his two wives Eva Modise and Jackie Sedibe, a former MK chief of communications and first SANDF female general who led the transformation agenda of the post-apartheid defence force; and his five daughters. She was one of MK's first female recruits the only living recipient of the Order of Mendi for Bravery (nine other recipients were posthumous) which South African President Jacob Zuma presented to other members of MK's Luthuli detachment on 29 April 2016.

== Legacy ==
On 6 December 2003, Mandela said the following about Modise:

"We are proud to be present at this unveiling ceremony, paying tribute to one of the brave freedom fighters of our movement and nation builders of our country.

My association with Joe Modise stretches back over many years. We have shared in moments that I remember with amusement as I now look back. We were comrades in activities that helped shape the future of our country, and I remember him with respect and admiration.

Joe Modise was one of those who gave virtually all of his life to the struggle and to the African National Congress. Before the banning of the organisation he was a brave and forthright opponent of the regime and an energetic organiser of resistance. He went into exile where he played a key role in the leadership of the movement. He rose to the highest rank in our liberation army, Umkonto we Sizwe.

He returned from exile to take part in the early negotiations with the apartheid regime and became the first Minister of Defence of democratic South Africa.

He presided over one of the most important facets of transformation in our country, the integration of the various statutory and non-statutory armed forces into one single South African National Defence Force. He led a process that laid the solid foundations for stability in the new South Africa – a disciplined defence force, loyal to the Constitution and the new democratic order.

We proudly remember this son of South Africa who so splendidly gave his life to the attainment of freedom and the building of a democratic South Africa.

We wish his family well, trusting that they will always take courage from his memory.

And may his example continue to inspire future generations to build in the way he did."

Joe Modise Section in Mamafubedu, Petrus Steyn, Free State is named after him.

== Awards and decorations ==
- Unitas (Unity) Medal
- Service Medal (Gold)
- Service Medal (Silver)
- Service Medal (Bronze)

== Notes ==
Political offices
Preceded by Kobie Coetsee	Minister of Defence (South Africa); 11 May 1994–17 June 1996	Succeeded by Mosiuoa Lekota
