= I Am Prepared to Die =

1964 speech by Nelson Mandela

"I Am Prepared to Die" was a three-hour speech given by Nelson Mandela on 20 April 1964 from the dock at the Rivonia Trial. The speech is so titled because it ended with the words "it is an ideal for which I am prepared to die". It is considered one of the greatest and most memorable speeches of the 20th century, and a key moment in the history of South African democracy.

During my lifetime I have dedicated myself to this struggle of the African people. I have fought against white domination, and I have fought against black domination. I have cherished the ideal of a democratic and free society in which all persons live together in harmony and with equal opportunities. It is an ideal which I hope to live for and to achieve. But if needs be, it is an ideal for which I am prepared to die.

— Nelson Mandela, at the conclusion of his speech

== Rivonia Trial ==
In July 1963, ten African National Congress (ANC) leaders were arrested in Rivonia, a suburb of Johannesburg. Along with Mandela, who had been arrested in August 1962 and was serving a five-year sentence, they were accused of counts of sabotage, furthering communism and aiding foreign powers. That included charges of recruiting persons to undertake guerrilla warfare against the South African state, conspiring to aid foreign military against the republic, and furthering acts of communism. The prosecutor Percy Yutar did not explicitly move for the death penalty, but it was generally believed that was what the state wanted. All defendants pleaded not guilty to the charges.

Before the trial, Mandela and the other defendants decided that instead of testifying as witnesses and submitting to cross-examination he would make a speech from the dock to put the state on trial, by pointing out the injustices of the South African society and its legal system. They also sought to show the political and moral programme of the ANC.

Mandela worked on the speech for weeks before the trial, receiving help in editing and polishing it from author Nadine Gordimer and journalist Anthony Sampson. In writing the speech, Mandela was inspired by Fidel Castro's "History Will Absolve Me" defence speech. He was particularly interested in making the speech appeal to an international audience, inspiring international support for the ANC cause.

Mandela's lawyers urged him to leave out the final statement, lest it provoke the judge into sentencing him to death, but Mandela refused. He felt that he was likely to be sentenced to death regardless of his statement so that saying what he truly felt this would be the best option. Nonetheless, he did add the qualifier "if needs be".

The prosecutor Percy Yutar made a surprise objection when the defense announced that Mandela would start by giving a speech instead of facing a more conventional cross-examination: "My Lord, My Lord, I think you should warn the accused that what he said from the dock has far less weight than if he submitted himself to cross-examination." Judge de Wet over-ruled the objection saying, "I think Mr. Yutar, that counsel for the defence have sufficient experience to be able to advise their clients without your assistance." Bram Fischer the main defense lawyer added "Neither we, nor our clients are unaware of the provisions of the Criminal Code", thus subtly pointing out the fact that Mandela was himself a lawyer with experience in criminal trials. Since in South African law, a defendant may not address the court from the witness stand but only answer questions, Mandela gave the speech from the defendant's dock. He spoke for some three hours before he concluded with the often-quoted "I am prepared to die".

While delivering the last line of the speech Mandela looked the judge, Quartus de Wet, directly in the eye, the last eye contact between the two during the trial.

== Speech ==
The speech describes why the ANC had decided to go beyond its previous use of constitutional methods and Gandhian non-violent resistance and adopt sabotage against property (designed to minimize risks of injury and death) as a part of their activism against the South African government and its apartheid policies (while also training a military wing for possible future use).

Mandela began by stating that he had been among the founders of uMkhonto we Sizwe, the armed wing of the ANC, and that he did not deny his involvement in planning sabotage: "I did not plan it in a spirit of recklessness, nor because I have any love for violence. I planned it as a result of a calm and sober assessment of the political situation that had arisen after many years of tyranny, exploitation, and oppression of my people by the whites."

Mandela argued that all nonviolent means had been tried and that they had resulted only in mounting restrictions and reduced freedom for the African people. Referring to the Sharpeville shootings and a number of other instances of government violence against protesters, he stated that "the government which uses force to support its rule teaches the oppressed to use force to oppose it" and that the decision to adopt selective use of violent means was "not because we desire such a course. Solely because the government left us no other choice."

Mandela also devoted significant effort to refuting the prosecution's charges that he and the ANC had acted under the domination of the Communist Party of South Africa and foreign interests. He likened the alliance between the communists and the ANC to the alliance of the US, Britain and the Soviet Union against Nazi Germany. He discussed in some detail the relationship between the ANC and the Communist Party and explained that while the two shared a commitment to action against the apartheid system, he was wedded to a model of constitutional democracy for South Africa (he singled out the British political model for particular praise) and also supported a market economy, rather than a communist economic model. He noted that while there were political differences between the Communists and the ANC, "theoretical differences among those fighting against oppression is (sic) a luxury that we cannot afford at this stage". He added that the communists had been the only political group in South Africa who had shown themselves willing to treat Africans as human beings.

=== Impact ===
Mandela's friends Anthony Sampson and Nadine Gordimer, who had both participated in reviewing the speech as written by Mandela, had contrasting reactions to its delivery. Sampson described it as the most effective speech of his career, whereas Gordimer thought the delivery to be "hesitant, parsonical" until "only at the end did the man come through and when he had spoken that last sentence the strangest and most moving sound I have ever heard from human throats, came from the 'black' side of the court audience" .

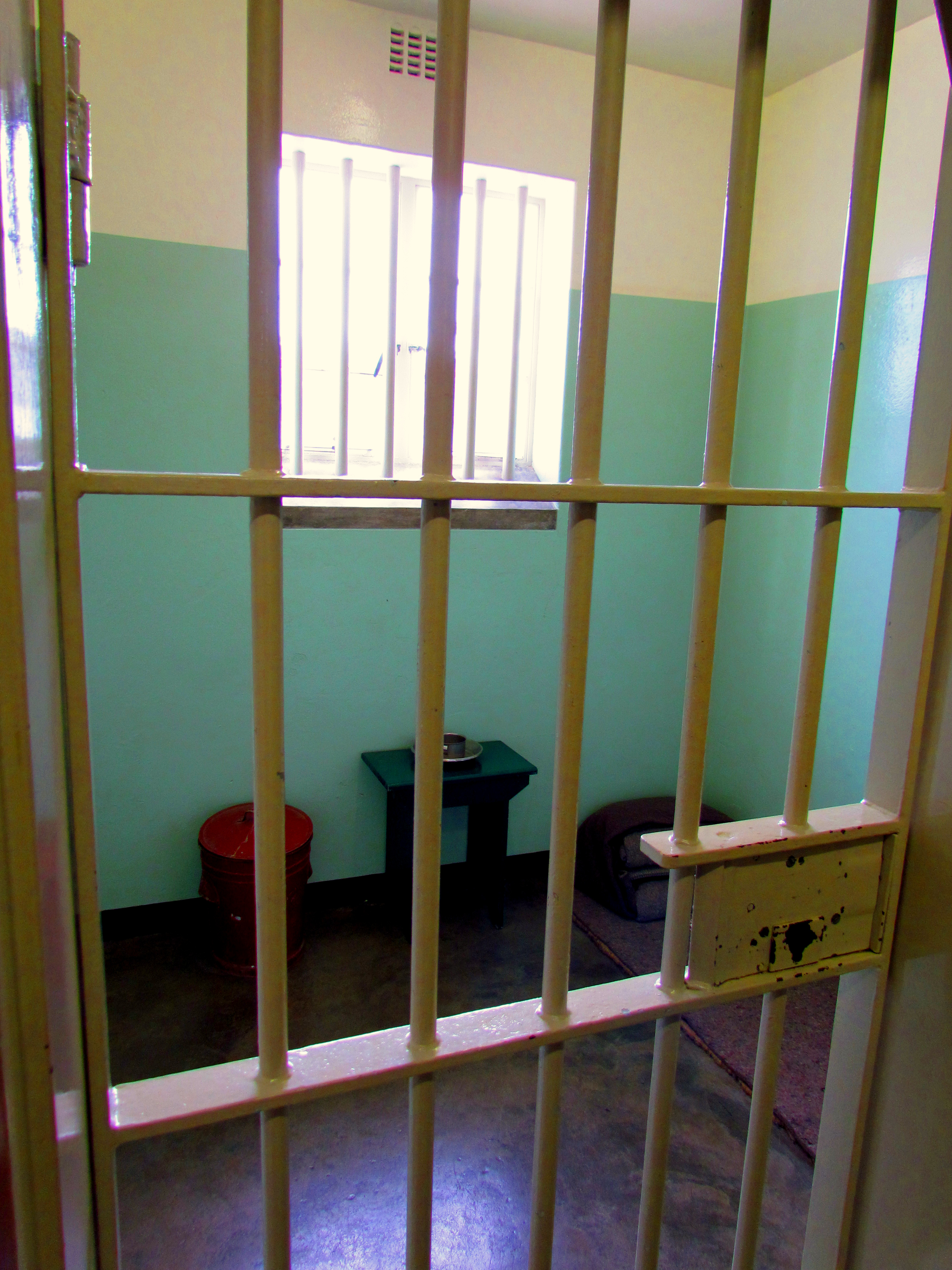
The prison cell Nelson Mandela spent 18 years in after the trial

At the end of the trial, Mandela was convicted and sentenced to life imprisonment. He served 27 years of the sentence before he was released and elected President of South Africa. Upon his release he quoted the last sentence of his speech to the awaiting press. Mandela believed that the reason Judge de Wet had not sentenced him to death was that in his speech, Mandela had "dared him to do so".

== Influence ==
- The "I am prepared to die" sentence was used by South African composer Michael Hankinson in his 2004 orchestral work "A Mandela Portrait" as the choral finale of the first movement.
- The last paragraph of the speech is written on the wall of South Africa's Constitutional Court building in Johannesburg.
- US President Barack Obama quoted from the speech during his tribute speech at the state memorial service for Nelson Mandela held at FNB Stadium in Johannesburg on 10 December 2013.
