= Babette Brown =

South African writer (1931–2019)

- Born: 1931; Johannesburg, South Africa
- Died: 10 February 2019 (aged 87–88)
- Occupation: Writer

Babette Brown (née Kotkin, 1931 – 10 February 2019) was a South African-born British writer on race and diversity issues.

== Early life and education ==
Brown's mother Annie had left Lithuania to escape the Russian pogroms against the Jews. She arrived in Cape Town in 1903 and lived in District Six before moving to Johannesburg where she would marry her cousin Lipman Kotkin, and where her daughter Babette was born.

She attended Parktown High School for Girls and graduated from the University of the Witwatersrand with a bachelor's degree in education and from Enfield Polytechnic in 1975 with a bachelor's degree in education in sociology.

== Career ==
She married Emanuel Brown in 1953. They were founding members of the Congress of Democrats and instrumental in the successful escape of four political detainees – Moosa Moolla, Harold Wolpe, Charlie Jassat, and Arthur Goldreich – from Marshall Square Police Station in Johannesburg on 11 August 1963. Facing arrest, the Browns and their four children went into exile in the UK and settled in London.

Brown's books include Unlearning Discrimination in the Early Years (1998) and Combatting Discrimination: Persona Dolls in Action (2001). She wrote a children's book, Separation, based on her childhood in Apartheid South Africa. She often wrote for Nursery World magazine.

== Awards and honours ==
In 1997, Brown won the Jerwood Award for her work with her charity EYTARN (Early Years Trainers Anti Racist Network). She was awarded the 2019 Chairman’s Award from the South African Chamber of Commerce UK posthumously.
