= Jafta Masemola =

South African anti-apartheid activist (1931–1990)

Jafta K. Masemola
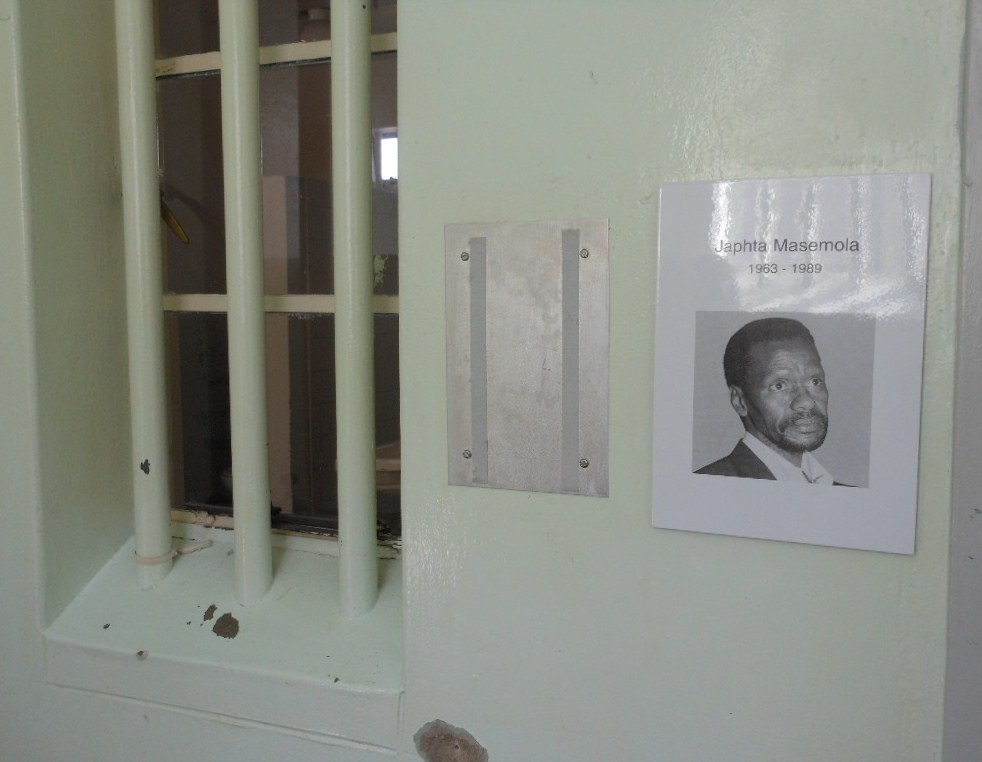
- Masemola's prison cell
- Born: Jafta Kgalabi Masemola; 12 December 1929; Pretoria, Union of South Africa
- Died: 17 April 1990 (aged 60); Johannesburg, South Africa
- Citizenship: South Africa
- Occupations: Teacher and politician
- Political party: Pan Africanist Congress (PAC)

Jafta Kgalabi Masemola OLS (12 December 1931 – 17 April 1990), also known as The Tiger of Azania and Bra Jeff, was a South African anti-apartheid activist, teacher, and founder of the armed wing of the Pan Africanist Congress (PAC). He is the only person to spend 27 years in South African prison [Robben Island] during the apartheid era in South Africa, and was released in October 1989, shortly before the legalization of the PAC and the African National Congress) by F. W. de Klerk. Masemola served the longest sentence of any political prisoner in Robben Island prison in South Africa.

Masemola was a teacher in Atteridgeville township in Pretoria in the 1950s.

Together with Robert Sobukwe, Masemola co-founded the PAC in 1959 in Soweto. Subsequently, he worked for the PAC's youth organization in Atteridgeville and then headed the PAC's military wing, Poqo.

In 1962, Masemola was arrested and convicted on the charge of smuggling individuals out of the country for military training and blowing up power lines. He was imprisoned at Robben Island.

He was released from the prison on 15 October 1989, together with ANC members Ahmed Kathrada, Raymond Mhlaba, Wilton Mkwayi, Andrew Mlangeni, Oscar Mpetha, Elias Motsoaledi and Walter Sisulu.

Masemola was killed in a car accident shortly after his release in 1990.
