= Liliesleaf Farm =

1960s safe house for African National Congress activists

Coordinates: 26°02′38″S 28°03′13″E

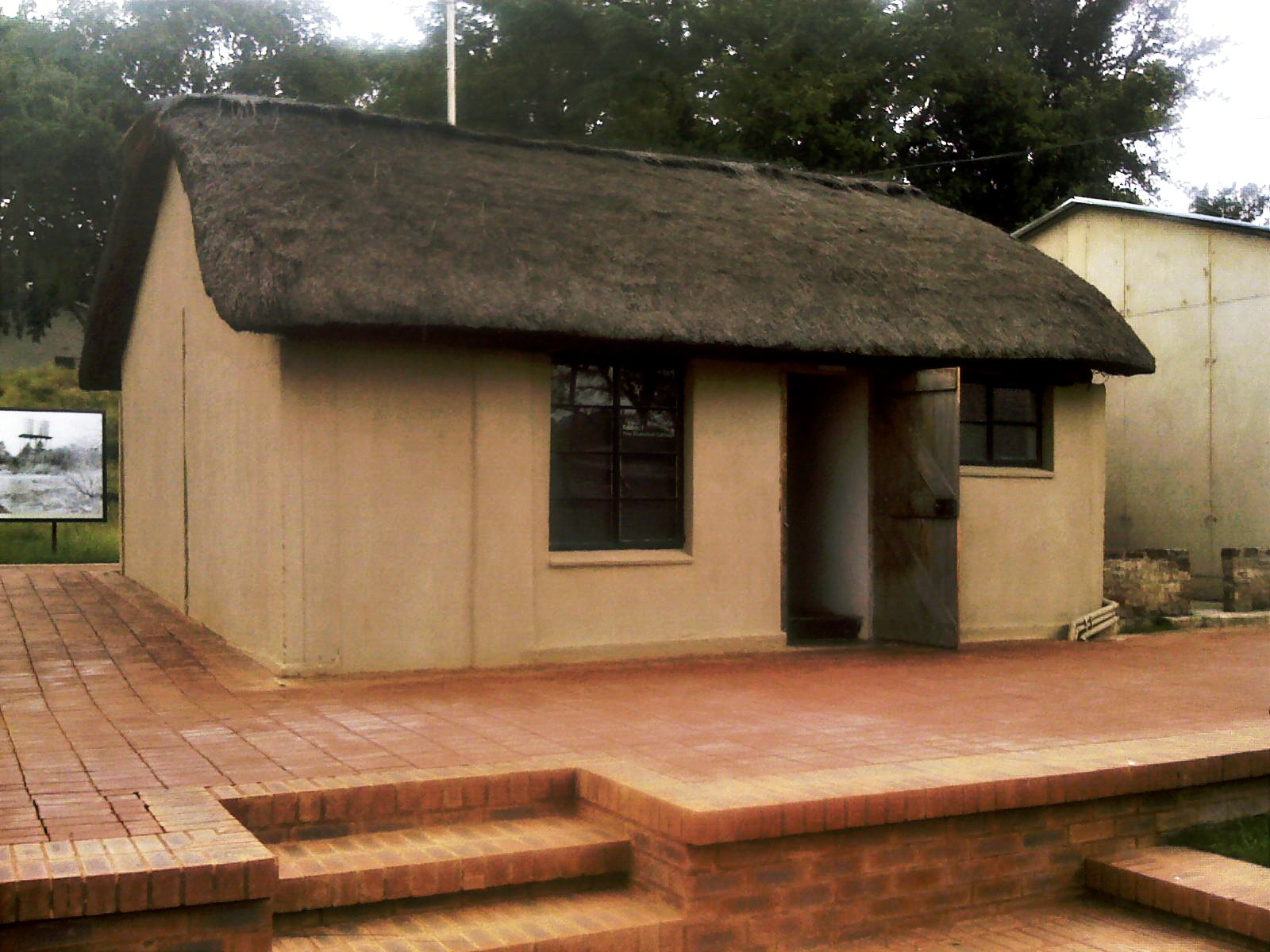
The thatched room at Liliesleaf Farm

Liliesleaf Farm, also spelt Lilliesleaf and also known simply as Liliesleaf, is a location in northern Johannesburg, South Africa, which is most noted for its use as a safe house for African National Congress (ANC) activists during the apartheid years in the 1960s. In 1963, the South African police raided the farm, arresting more than a dozen ANC leaders and activists, who were then tried and prosecuted during the Rivonia Trial.

After the end of apartheid, the property was restored and turned into a museum and national heritage site. It was closed to visitors in September 2021, but was scheduled to reopen a year later.

== History ==
The farmhouse is located on George Avenue in Rivonia, once a remote spot in a country village, now a suburb around 20–26 km (12–16 mi) north of Johannesburg, in the Sandton area. In 1961, the property was purchased by Arthur Goldreich and Harold Wolpe with funds from the underground South African Communist Party, to use as a safe house for political fugitives. Goldreich lived there with his then wife Hazel and their two sons, Nicholas and Paul. Being white South Africans in an area reserved for white people, they did not attract attention, and provided cover for black anti-apartheid activists. It was acquired at a time when there was a shift in focus and tactics within the liberation movement, from passive resistance to armed struggle, when uMkhonto we Sizwe (MK) was established. Liliesleaf soon became the headquarters of MK.

African National Congress leader Nelson Mandela needed a safe place from which to operate, and lived there under the assumed identity as a farmworker called David Motsamayi, which was the name of one of his former clients. However he was arrested in Howick in August 1962 on unrelated charges (inciting workers to strike, and departing South Africa without valid travel documents). Others who met in secret at Liliesleaf included Walter Sisulu, Govan Mbeki, Ahmed Kathrada, Denis Goldberg, Raymond Mhlaba, Elias Motsoaledi, Andrew Mlangeni, James Kantor, Ruth First, Joe Slovo, and Lionel Bernstein.

MK launched Operation O Mayibuye (aka Operation Mayibuye) from Liliesleaf. On 11 July 1963, security police raided the farm and arrested 19 members of the underground, later charging and prosecuting a number of them with sabotage. The police had learned of the location from two sources: George Mellis, who lived nearby in the Rivonia Caravan Park, noticed a number of cars going in and out of the farm area and told his family; and a police informant in MK. The activists had been meeting in the thatched room and were surprised by the raid. They had already decided beforehand to move to another safe house, with 11 July being their last meeting at Liliesleaf. The police found documents during the raid that incriminated Mandela, so he was charged and brought to trial with the others.

The trial, which ran from October 1963 to June 1964, ended with Mandela and other prominent leaders, including Sisulu, Govan Mbeki, Kathrada, Goldberg, Mhlaba, Motsoaledi, and Mlangeni being found guilty and sentenced to life imprisonment.

== The site as a museum ==
The Schreider family bought the farm after the raid and turned into a guest house. However, after a reunion of the accused in the Rivonia Trial held in 2001, Nicholas Wolpe (son of Harold Wolpe and nephew of James Kantor) decided to establish a trust which would own and administer the site and create a museum for future generations.

The first phase of its restoration began in 2008. Exhibits were created, and a café, along with overnight accommodation, a conference centre, and various other buildings were constructed. It was recognised by the South African Government (headed by the ANC after they were democratically elected in 1994) as a national asset, of significance to both the history of the ANC and the South African liberation struggle. From around 2008 the Department of Sports, Arts and Culture and its predecessors provided more than R 70 million for its maintenance.

On 24 November 2014 it was listed as a Grade 1 site. The site was nominated for World Heritage Site status, as one of a group called "Human Rights, Liberation Struggle and Reconciliation: Nelson Mandela Legacy Sites", in 2015. On 2 September 2016 Liliesleaf was declared a national heritage site in the South African Government Gazette.

The site was owned by the Liliesleaf Trust, and run by Nicholas Wolpe, founder and CEO of the trust, until 2021. From around 2008 until its closure in 2021, during the COVID-19 pandemic, the Department of Sports, Arts and Culture provided more than R 70 million for its maintenance. However, the museum closed its doors in September 2021, during the COVID-19 pandemic, a decision made by the CEO without consulting the board. The department said that Wolpe had not used R 8.1 million of a funding grant given to Liliesleaf in 2015, and that they would be taking it over. (Apparently it was supposed to have been spent on capital expenditure, but Wolpe spent it on running costs.) On 10 March 2022, the board suspended Wolpe, and the reopening of Liliesleaf was scheduled to take place in September 2022. Sport, Arts and Culture Minister Nathi Mthethwa said that a process had begun towards declaring Liliesleaf Museum "as a cultural institution in accordance with the Cultural Institutions Act". This would enable Parliament to oversee the museum. There was some concern that there was a political motive in using the museum to promote the ANC, but board member Themba Wakashe said that he would not allow this to happen, as it was a site for all South Africans.

== Artefacts ==
The museum houses many significant historical artefacts, including the original copy of the Freedom Charter, Mandela's arrest warrant, and Oliver Tambo's pen gun.
