= Rivonia Trial =

1963–64 arrest and trial of activist leaders in Pretoria, South Africa

The Rivonia Trial was a trial that took place in apartheid-era South Africa between 9 October 1963 and 12 June 1964, after a group of anti-apartheid activists were arrested on Liliesleaf Farm in Rivonia. The farm had been the secret location for meetings of uMkhonto we Sizwe (MK), the newly-formed armed wing of the African National Congress. The trial took place in Pretoria at the Palace of Justice and the Old Synagogue.

Men who were convicted and sentenced to prison for their activities included Nelson Mandela, Walter Sisulu, Govan Mbeki, Ahmed Kathrada, Denis Goldberg, Raymond Mhlaba, Elias Motsoaledi, Andrew Mlangeni. Many were convicted of sabotage and sentenced to life.

== Origins ==
The Rivonia Trial took its name from Rivonia, a suburb of Johannesburg. Various people and groups, including the African National Congress and Communist Party of South Africa, had been using Liliesleaf Farm, owned by Arthur Goldreich, as a hideout. Nelson Mandela moved onto the farm in October 1961 and evaded security police while masquerading as a gardener and cook named David Motsamayi. He was arrested on 5 August 1962 without the farm having been discovered.

On 11 July 1963, the farm was raided by the South African Police. Lionel Bernstein, Denis Goldberg, Arthur Goldreich, Bob Hepple, Abdulhay Jassat, Ahmed Kathrada, Govan Mbeki, Raymond Mhlaba, Andrew Mlangeni, Moosa Moolla, Elias Motsoaledi, Walter Sisulu and Harold Wolpe were all arrested. They were detained under the General Law Amendment Act No 37 of 1963, which allowed for detention of up to ninety days. Other key leaders such as Oliver Tambo, Moses Kotane, Joe Slovo, Moses Mabhida, Stephen Dlamini, Joe Modise, Alfred Nzo, Wilton Mkwayi and others were not at the farm at the time of these arrests.

Mandela was placed under surveillance by British MI6 agents. Details of his alleged terrorist activities were picked up by the CIA and handed over to local authorities.

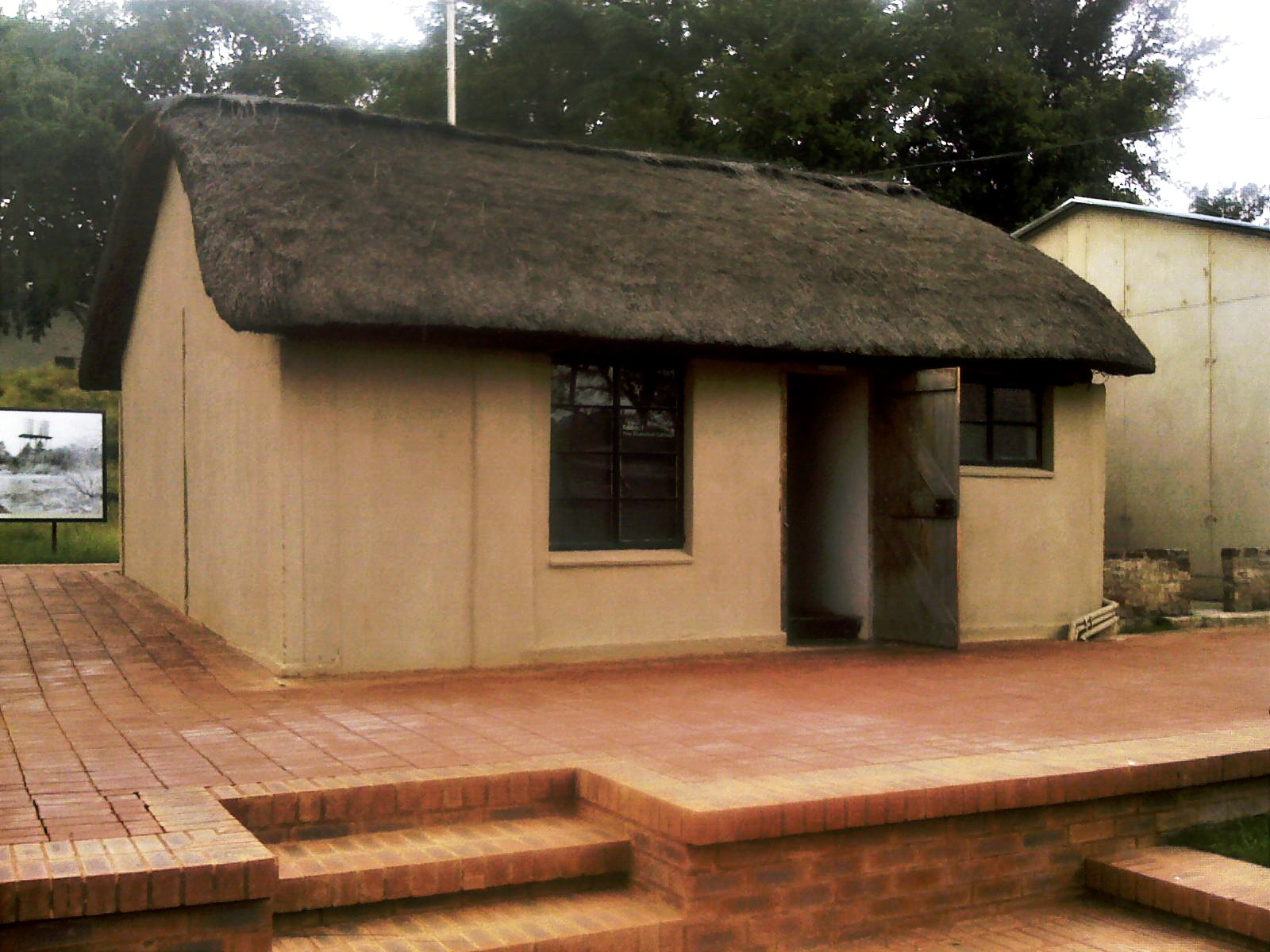
The thatched room at Liliesleaf Farm

The arrest of the MK high command members resulted in their being sentenced to life imprisonment. The actions led to other activists being arrested, and others going into exile.

== Those arrested and those who stood trial ==
Arrested were (in alphabetical order):

- Lionel Bernstein, architect and member of the South African Communist Party (SACP)
- Denis Goldberg, a Cape Town engineer and leader of the Congress of Democrats
- Arthur Goldreich
- Bob Hepple
- Abdulhay Jassat
- James Kantor, brother-in-law of Harold Wolpe
- Ahmed Kathrada
- Nelson Mandela
- Govan Mbeki
- Raymond Mhlaba
- Andrew Mlangeni
- Moosa Moolla
- Elias Motsoaledi, trade union and ANC member
- Walter Sisulu
- Harold Wolpe, prominent attorney and activist

Goldberg, Bernstein, Wolpe, Kantor, and Goldreich were white Jewish South Africans; Hepple was of English descent on his father's side and Dutch and Jewish on his mother's. Jassat, Kathrada, Moolla were Indian Muslims. Mandela, Mbeki and Mhlaba were indigenous Xhosa; Motsoaledi and Mlangeni were Sotho, and Sisulu was Xhosa (he had an English father and a Xhosa mother).

Leaders prosecuted in the Rivonia Trial included Mandela, who was already being held in Pretoria Local prison, where he was serving a five-year sentence for inciting workers to strike – trade unions were illegal for black workers – and leaving the country illegally.

The government took advantage of legal provisions allowing for accused persons to be held for 90 days without trial, and held the defendants incommunicado. Withstanding beatings and torture, Goldreich, Jassat, Moolla, and Wolpe escaped from jail on 11 August. Their escape infuriated the prosecutors and police, who considered Goldreich to be "the arch-conspirator".

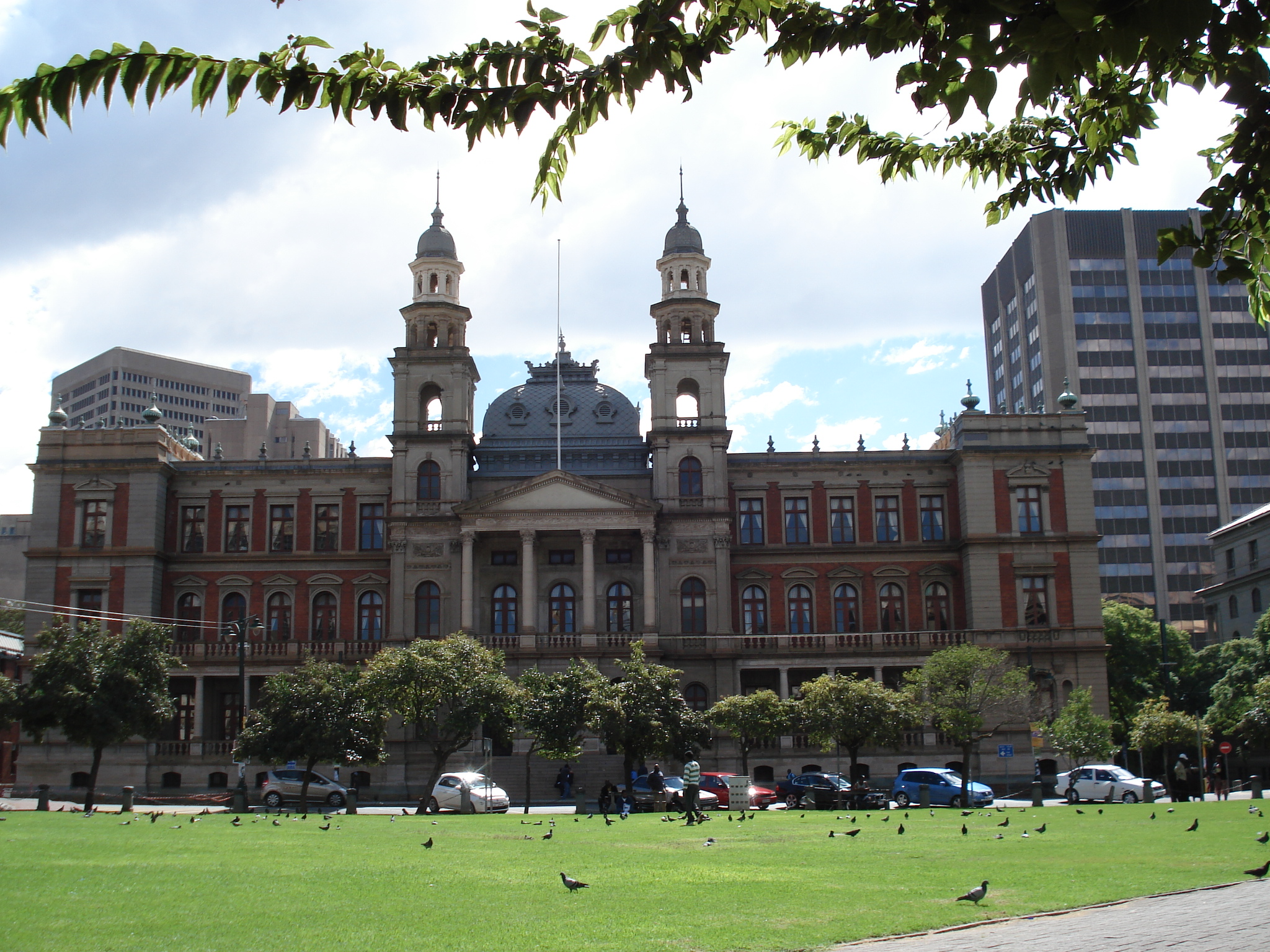
The Palace of Justice in Pretoria, site of the trial

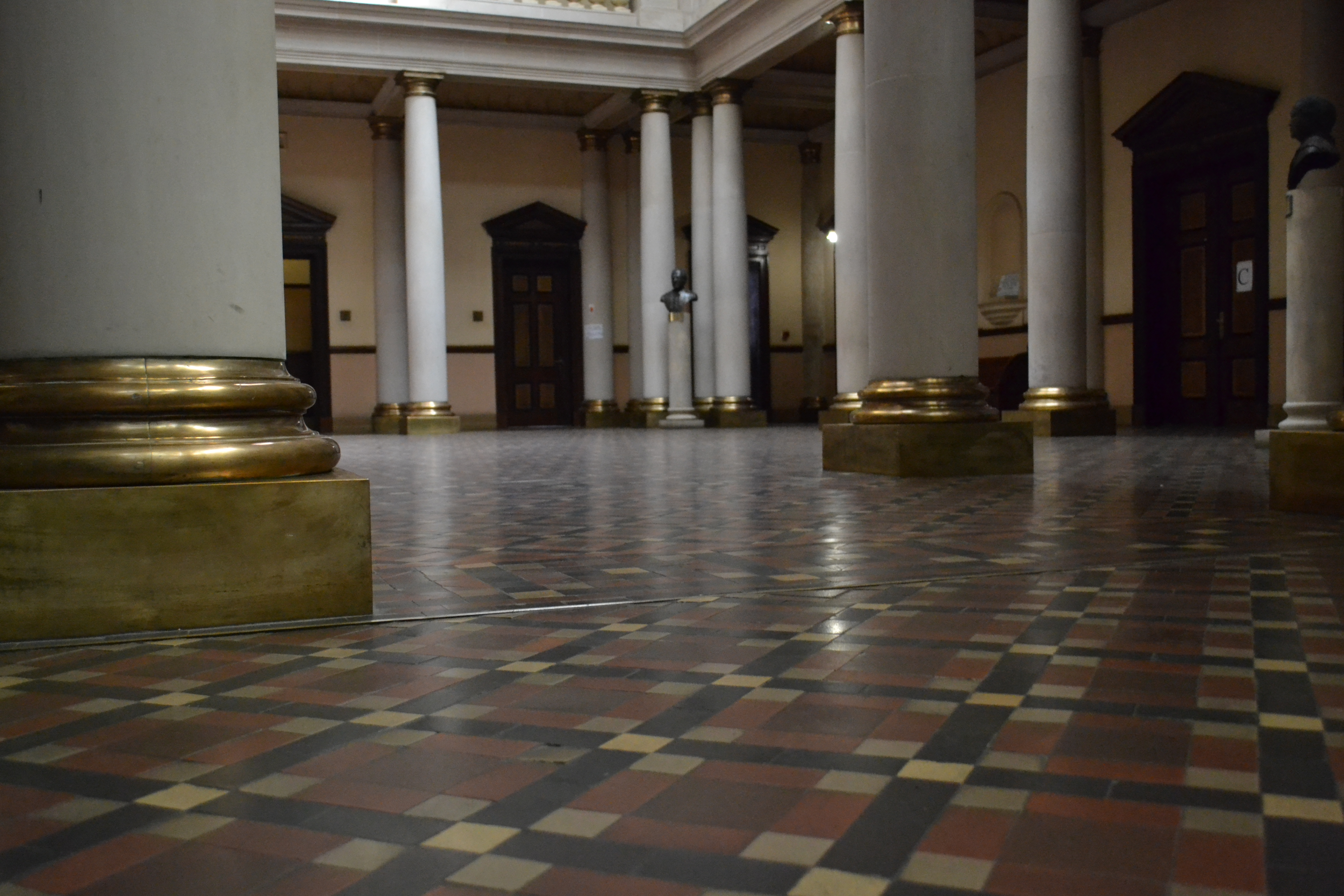
Palace of Justice interior

The chief prosecutor was Percy Yutar, deputy attorney-general of the Transvaal. The presiding judge was Quartus de Wet, judge-president of the Transvaal. The first trial indictment document listed 11 names as the accused. The trial began on the 6 October 1963 til 12 June 1964.

Counsel for the accused successfully challenged the legal sufficiency of the document, with the result that Justice de Wet quashed it. Prior to dismissal of the first indictment, the state withdrew all charges against Bob Hepple. He subsequently fled the country, without testifying. He stated "that he never had any intention of testifying".

The second indictment listed 10 of the original 11 names, referring to them as Accused 1 through 10:

- Nelson Mandela (Accused No. 1)
- Walter Sisulu (Accused No. 2)
- Denis Goldberg (Accused No. 3)
- Govan Mbeki (Accused No. 4)
- Ahmed Kathrada (Accused No. 5)
- Lionel Bernstein (Accused No. 6)
- Raymond Mhlaba (Accused No. 7)
- James Kantor (Accused No. 8)
- Elias Motsoaledi (Accused No. 9)
- Andrew Mlangeni (Accused No. 10); he was the last to testify on trial
- Bob Hepple (Accused No. 11); he never testified.

Mlangeni, who died on 21 July 2020, was the last surviving Rivonia defendant following the death of Goldberg on 29 April that same year.

== Defence lawyers ==
Nat Levy was attorney of record in Pretoria for Mandela and the other accused, with the exception of Kantor, "who had no connection with the other defendants and was seemingly charged only as a proxy for his brother-in-law and law partner, Harold Wolpe."

The defence team comprised Joel Joffe, who was the instructing attorney, Bram Fischer, Vernon Berrangé, Arthur Chaskalson and George Bizos. Hilda Bernstein (wife of Rusty Bernstein) had approached Joffe after being rebuffed by other lawyers who claimed to be too busy or afraid to act for her husband. Joffe was subsequently also approached by Albertina Sisulu (wife of Walter Sisulu), Annie Goldberg (mother of Dennis Goldberg), and Winnie Mandela (wife of Nelson Mandela). Joffe agreed to act as attorney for all of the accused except Kantor, who would require separate counsel, and Bob Hepple.

Joffe initially secured the services of advocates Arthur Chaskalson and George Bizos; he persuaded Bram Fischer to act as lead counsel. Vernon Berrangé was also later recruited to join the team of advocates. The defence line-up for the majority of the accused was:

- Joel Joffe (instructing attorney)
- Bram Fischer (advocate, lead counsel)
- Vernon Berrangé (advocate)
- George Bizos (advocate)
- Arthur Chaskalson (advocate)
- Harold Hanson (advocate)

The accused all agreed that Kantor's defence could share nothing in common with the rest of the accused. He arranged a separate defence team. Denis Kuny (later counsel in the Bram Fischer trial), was involved at the beginning of the trial defending Kantor. After State Prosecutor Yutar accused him of having been on the mailing list of the Communist Party, Kuny was debriefed and forced to withdraw. While Harold Hanson primarily represented Kantor, he was also invited to deliver the plea for mitigation for the other 9 accused. The defence line-up for Kantor was:

- John Coaker (advocate)
- Harold Hanson (advocate)
- George Lowen (advocate)
- H. C. Nicholas (advocate)
- Harry Schwarz (advocate)

== Charges ==
Charges were:

- recruiting persons for training in the preparation and use of explosives and in guerrilla warfare for the purpose of violent revolution and committing acts of sabotage
- conspiring to commit the aforementioned acts and to aid foreign military units when they invaded the Republic
- acting in these ways to further the objectives of communism
- soliciting and receiving money for these purposes from sympathizers in Uganda, Algeria, Ethiopia, Liberia, Nigeria, Tunisia, and elsewhere.

"Production requirements" for munitions for a six-month period were sufficient, the prosecutor Percy Yutar said in his opening address, to blow up a city the size of Johannesburg.

Kantor was discharged at the end of the prosecution's case.

The trial was condemned by the United Nations Security Council and nations around the world. Some nations instituted international sanctions against the South African government.

== Escapes ==
In August 11, a month later after their arrest; Arthur Goldreich, Abdulhay Jassat, Moosa Moolla, and Harold Wolpe escaped from The Fort prison in Johannesburg while on remand after bribing a prison guard. After hiding in various safe houses for two months, Goldreich and Wolpe escaped to Swaziland, smuggled through the border in the boot of a car driven by Euan Crawford Annmarie Wolpe "The Long Road Home" pg 215. From Swaziland, Vernon Berrangé was to charter a plane to take the men to Lobatse, a small town in south-eastern Botswana.From there, dressed as a priests the pair, aided by Mannie Brown, made their way into Tanzania and eventually to the UK. Brown later helped to set up tour operator Africa Hinterland as a cover to deliver weapons to the ANC. Jassat and Moolla escaped into exile in India.

After Wolpe escaped, his brother-in-law James Kantor, who had been serving as a member of the defence team, was arrested and charged with the same crimes as Mandela and his co-accused. Harry Schwarz, a close friend and a politician, acted as his defence. After being dealt with aggressively by the prosecutor Percy Yutar, who sought to portray him as a vital cog of MK, Kantor was discharged by Judge Quartus de Wet. He ruled that Kantor had no case to answer. Following his release, Kantor fled the country. He died in 1974 of a heart attack.

== Mandela's speech ==
At the beginning of the defence's proceedings, Nelson Mandela gave a three-hour speech from the defendant's dock, in which he explained and defended the ANC's key political positions. He justified the movement's decision, in view of the increasing restrictions on permitted political activity on the part of non-White Africans, to go beyond its earlier use of constitutional methods and Gandhian non-violent opposition to the state, embracing a campaign of sabotage against property (designed to minimize risks of injury and death), while also starting to train a military wing for possible future use. He also discussed in some detail the relationship between the ANC and the SACP, explaining that, while the two shared a commitment to action against the apartheid system, he was wedded to a model of constitutional democracy for South Africa (he singled out the British political model for particular praise), and also supported a market economy rather than a communist economic model. The speech is considered one of the founding moments of South African democracy.

Mandela's closing words have been much quoted. His statement that he was prepared to die for the cause was strongly resisted by his lawyers, who feared it might provoke a death sentence. In a concession to their concerns, Mandela inserted the words "if needs be".

Speaking in the dock of the court on 20 April 1964, he said:

During my lifetime I have dedicated myself to this struggle of the African people. I have fought against white domination, and I have fought against black domination. I have cherished the ideal of a democratic and free society in which all persons live together in harmony and with equal opportunities. It is an ideal which I hope to live for and to achieve. But if needs be, it is an ideal for which I am prepared to die.

== Results ==
Although the prosecution did not formally request the death penalty, close observers of the trial considered such a sentence to be implicit in the prosecutor's presentation of his case. Opposition to the death penalty included both public campaigns internationally, the United Nations, and the defence's arguments within the courtroom. Harold Hanson was called upon to argue in mitigation. He compared the African struggle for rights to the earlier Afrikaner's struggle, citing precedents for temperate sentencing, even in cases of treason. On 12 June 1964, eight defendants were sentenced to life imprisonment; Lionel Bernstein was acquitted. Unsubstantiated evidence suggests that Hanson, in a private hearing with de Wet, persuaded him to commute the death sentence for high treason to life imprisonment.

There was no surprise in the fact that Mandela, Sisulu, Mbeki, Motsoaledi, Mlangeni, and Goldberg were found guilty on all four counts. The defence had hoped that Mhlaba, Kathrada, and Bernstein might escape conviction because of the skimpiness of evidence that they were parties to the conspiracy, although undoubtedly they could be prosecuted on other charges. But Mhlaba too was found guilty on all counts, and Kathrada, on one charge of conspiracy. Bernstein, however, was found not guilty. He was rearrested, released on bail, and placed under house arrest. Later he fled the country.

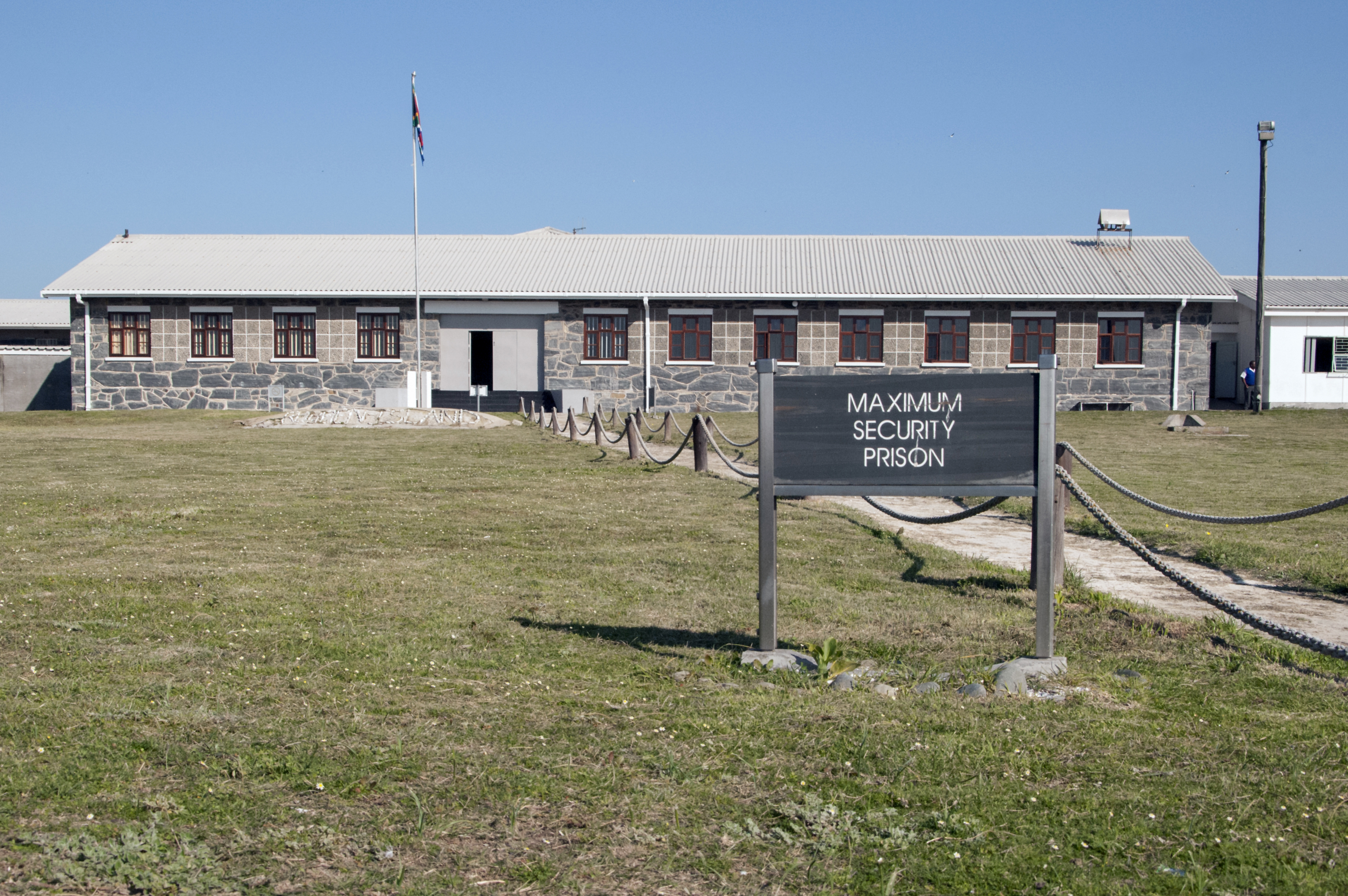
Maximum Security Prison, Robben Island

Denis Goldberg went to Pretoria Central Prison instead of Robben Island (at that time it was the only security wing for white political prisoners in South Africa). He served 22 years.

== Releases ==
- In 1985, 28 February; Denis Goldberg was released from the custody of the National Party government after being held for 22 years in Pretoria Central Prison's white prison. He was released by order of President P. W. Botha.
- In 1987, 5 November; Govan Mbeki was released from the custody of the National Party government after serving 24 years in the Robben Island prison. He was released by order of President P. W. Botha.
- In 1989, 15 October; Ahmed Kathrada, Raymond Mhlaba, Andrew Mlangeni, Elias Motsoaledi and Walter Sisulu were released from the custody of the National Party government after spending 26 years each in Robben Island and Pollsmoor Prison. Their release also included Wilton Mkwayi, who had been incarcerated for 25 years after being convicted in the Little Rivonia Trial; Oscar Mpetha, imprisoned for more than 6 years; and co-founder and former leader of the Pan Africanist Congress Jafta Masemola after he had been imprisoned for 27 years. They were released by order of President F. W. de Klerk.
- In 1990, 11 February; Nelson Mandela was released after being imprisoned for 27 years and eight months as a result of the Rivonia trial (18 years of which were spent on Robben Island). He was released by order of President F. W. de Klerk.

== Restoration of the Rivonia Trial sound archive ==
The Rivonia Trial was recorded on Dictabelts, a now obsolete audio recording format. Nearly 250 hours of the trial proceedings were recorded on 591 Dictabelts, kept by the National Archives and Records Service of South Africa (NARSSA). In 2001, seven of the Dictabelts were digitised by the British Library. This material included Nelson Mandela's "I am prepared to die" statement from the dock. In 2007, documents relating to the Criminal Court Case No. 253/1963 (State Versus N Mandela and Others) were added by UNESCO to its Memory of the World Register.

In 2012, NARSSA approached the French Institute of South Africa (IFAS) and the French National Audiovisual Institute (INA) to start a process of digitisation and restoration of the rest of the Rivonia Trial sound archive. French engineer, historian and inventor, Henri Chamoux, took a little over 15 months to edit and digitize 230 hours of recording using his own invention, the Archeophone.

The digitised recordings were officially returned to South Africa, in 2018. This was part of Nelson Mandela's Centenary, a one-day international colloquium "Listening to the Rivonia Trial : Courts, Archives and Liberation Movements" organised to commemorate his life and to discuss issues relating to the act of collecting, mapping, digitising and restoring archives and raising ethical questions that, in turn, become historical questions.

== In film ==
- The 1966 film entitled Der Rivonia-Prozess directed by Jürgen Goslar with Simon Sabela as Nelson Mandela.
- The 2017 film entitled Bram Fischer (aka An Act of Defiance), directed by Jean van de Velde, covers the story of the trial, focusing on the lead counsel for the defence, Bram Fischer.
- In 2017 the two remaining survivors of the Rivonia trial – Denis Goldberg and Andrew Mlangeni – appeared in a documentary film entitled Life is Wonderful, directed by Sir Nicholas Stadlen. It recounts the events of the trial. (The title reflects Goldberg's words to his mother at the end of the trial on hearing that he and his comrades had been spared the death sentence).
- A 2018 French documentary entitled The State Against Mandela and the Others (written by journalist Nicolas Champeaux and directed by Gilles Porte), covers the trial by using historic audio recordings and charcoal-style animation. It also includes excerpts of interviews with some of the accused and others involved directly or indirectly in the trial.

== See also ==
- List of massacres in South Africa
- Little Rivonia Trial
- The World That Was Ours
- 1956 Treason Trial
- 1963 in South Africa
- 1964 in South Africa
