= Isitwalandwe/Seaparankoe =

Highest award given by the African National Congress

Isithwalandwe/Seaparankoe
- Awarded for: Outstanding contribution and sacrifice to the liberation struggle
- Sponsored by: African National Congress
- Country: South Africa
- Formerly called: Isithwalandwe Medal (until 1994)
- Website: Official website

Isithwalandwe/Seaparankoe, until 1994 known as the Isithwalandwe Medal, also known as the Isithwalandwe Award and also spelt Isithwalandwe and Isithwalandwe/Seaparankwe, is the highest award given by the African National Congress (ANC) "to those who have made an outstanding contribution and sacrifice to the liberation struggle", that is, those who resisted the apartheid regime in South Africa (1949−1991) in various ways.

Isithwalandwe means "the one who wears the plumes of the rare bird", in particular the blue crane. This type of honor is taken directly from Xhosa culture where the plume of the Ndwe bird was used as an award. It was customarily only given to the bravest warriors, those distinguished by their leadership and heroism.

== Recipients ==
Recipients include:

- 1955 Yusuf Dadoo
- 1955 Father Trevor Huddleston
- 1955 Chief Albert Luthuli
- 1975 Moses Kotane
- 1980 Govan Mbeki
- 1980 Bishop Ambrose Reeves
- 1982 Lilian Ngoyi
- 1988 Ahmed Kathrada
- 1992 Harry Gwala
- 1992 Helen Joseph
- 1992 Nelson Mandela
- 1992 Raymond Mhlaba
- 1992 Wilton Mkwayi
- 1992 Andrew Mlangeni
- 1992 Elias Motsoaledi
- 1992 Walter Sisulu
- 1992 Oliver Tambo
- 1994 Joe Slovo
- 2004 Rachel Simons
- 2008 Chris Hani
- 2014 Ruth Mompati
- 2014 Gertrude Shope
- 2019 Denis Goldberg
- 2019 Sophia De Bruyn,
- 2019 John Nkadimeng
- 2019 Winnie Madikizela-Mandela
- 2019 Ahmed Timol
- 2019 Albertina Sisulu
- 2019 Charlotte Maxeke
- 2023 Ben Fihla
