= James Kantor =

South African lawyer and writer (1927–1974)

James Kantor (26 February 1927 – 2 February 1974) was a South African lawyer and writer.

James Kantor was born in Johannesburg to a Jewish family. A prominent Johannesburg lawyer in the 1950s, Kantor was attorney for Nelson Mandela and imprisoned with him during the Rivonia Trial. He later immigrated to England and wrote an autobiography.

== Rivonia Trial ==
Kantor was one of the defence lawyers in the Rivonia Trial until his brother-in-law and legal partner Harold Wolpe, one of the accused, managed to escape. At this stage, Kantor was himself arrested and charged with the same crimes as Mandela and the other defendants although he had no involvement with the ANC or MK. Harold Hanson and Harry Schwarz, a close friend and a well-known politician, stepped in to act as his defence lawyers in the trial. After aggressive treatment by the prosecutor Percy Yutar, who sought to portray Kantor as a vital cog of MK, finally Judge Quartus de Wet discharged Kantor, stating "Accused No. 8 has no case to answer".

== Later life ==
Kantor fled South Africa and settled in London, working in publications for the film industry. He married and he and his wife Barbara had two daughters and he also adopted Barbara's two sons from a previous marriage. He wrote an autobiography, called A Healthy Grave. However, his health had never recovered from the harsh treatment while in prison awaiting trial, and he died of a massive heart attack in 1974.
