= Jackie Sedibe =

Refiloe Jackie Phelile Florence Sedibe (born 1945) is a retired South African National Defence Force (SANDF) Major General. Sedibe was part of the African National Congress (ANC) prior to the end of apartheid and also a member of the uMkhonto we Sizwe (MK). She was one of the first women involved in MK and the first black woman to hold the rank of Major General in the SANDF.

== Biography ==
Sedibe was born in 1945 in White River. Around age six, her parents split up and Sedibe went to live with her uncle, Ben Sedibe, who was also an activist in the African National Congress (ANC). Sedibe followed her uncle's lead and became active in the ANC by delivering leaflets and carrying messages. In 1964 she became one of the first women involved in the uMkhonto we Sizwe (MK) when she joined at age 17. Sedibe was sent to the Soviet Union for training at the Odessa Infantry Academy and went on to receive training on military combat and "clandestine radio communications" in 1966.

Sedibe's first mission was on the Wankie Operation, where she worked as a radio operator in Lusaka between 1969 and 1971. During the operations, she became the communications chief. Starting in 1972, she worked in ANC branches as a secretary and chairperson and also wrote and co-edited the Voice of Women Bulletin. In Lusaka, between 1976 and 1977, she worked with Zambian immigration officials to process new recruits and in 1978, she became a member of the Revolutionary Council. In 1984, Sedibe was appointed to the ANC's National Executive Committee (NEC). In 1990, she became the communications head for the military department of the ANC at their headquarters in Johannesburg.

After returning from exile, Sedibe was part of the first group of former MK members to become integrated into the South African military in 1994. She started working for the office of inspector general where she has focused on women's issues in the South African National Defence Force (SANDF). Sedibe was promoted to the rank of major general in 1996. She is considered the first black woman to hold that rank in the SANDF.

In 2016, she was awarded the Order of Mendi for Bravery.

== Personal life ==
Sedibe was married to Joe Modise and the couple had two daughters, Dipuso and Lesedi.

Military offices
Preceded by Mo Oelschig	Chief Director Equal Opportunities; 1996 – ??	Succeeded by Ntsiki Memela-Motumi as Chief Director Transformational Management
