= Moosa Moolla =

South African activist and diplomat (1934–2023)

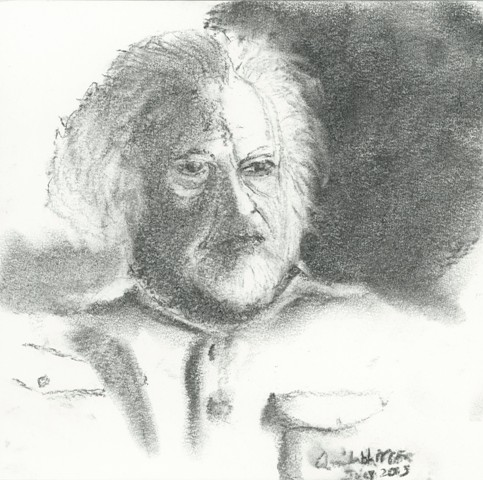
- Charcoal portrait of Moosa Moolla by Amitabh Mitra
- Born: 12 June 1934; Christiana, Transvaal, Union of South Africa (now North West Province, South Africa)
- Died: 25 March 2023 (aged 88)
- Occupations: Diplomat, anti-apartheid activist

Moosa Moolla OLS (12 June 1934 – 25 March 2023) was an Indian South African activist and diplomat. A member of the African National Congress, Moolla was arrested and eventually found not guilty in the 1956 Treason Trial. In 1961, he was arrested and tried for incitement at the time of the May 1961 stay-at-home protest. In May 1963, he was arrested under the 90-day law. On 11 August 1963, Moolla and others escaped prison by bribing a young guard. He later served as the ANC representative to Asia while living in exile in India. Following independence, he became the first South African ambassador to Iran.

== Background ==
Moosa “Mosie” Moolla was born in the small, (then) western Transvaal town of Christiana on 12 June 1934 where his father ran a successful import-export business. The family was forced to relocate to Bloemhof, a nearby town, following the Great Depression of the 1930s. Moolla did his primary schooling in Bloemhof. Since there were no high schools catering for blacks, Moolla was forced to move to Johannesburg in 1949 to pursue his secondary education.

== Political life ==
The developments in national and international politics during this period sparked Moolla's interest in current affairs. Boarding with a Transvaal Indian Congress (TIC) stalwart, Mrs. Ouma Bhayat, and surrounded by other TIC activists such as Dr. Vallabh Jaga, Dr. Zainab Asvat and Dr. Abdulhaq Patel, Mosie was recruited into the newly launched Transvaal Indian Youth Congress (TIYC). The very first campaign he actively participated in was the 1950 May Day strike, in protest of the Suppression of Communism Act.

During this period the Picasso Club was formed for the purposes of writing political slogans on public walls. Among its members were Moolla, Ahmed Kathrada, Babla Saloojee, Faried Adams and Solly Esakjee.

Moolla quickly moved up the ranks of the youth movement through actively participating in activities of the TIYC by silk-screening and putting up posters, writing and distributing leaflets. He was elected to the organisation's executive committee and then as the joint honorary secretary and finally as Chair, a position he held for nearly a decade.

In his matriculation year, 1952, Moolla participated in the Campaign for the Defiance of Unjust Laws and was imprisoned for close to a month. Due to his detention, Moolla was expelled and could not write his matriculation examinations. At the beginning of the campaign for the Congress of the People (COP), the Congress movement requested Moolla to leave his administrative job in a manufacturing company in order to serve full time on the Secretariat of the National Action Council of the COP.

Members of the Secretariat such as Walter Sisulu, Joe Slovo, Rusty Bernstein and Yusuf Cachalia were banned under the Suppression of Communism Act. It therefore became Moolla's responsibility to ensure that all decisions of the Secretariat were effectively conveyed to all provincial and regional committees of the National Action Council.

He served in this capacity until the culmination of the COP campaign with the adoption of the Freedom Charter in Kliptown on 25 and 26 June 1955. Moolla was later elected onto the executive of the TIC and also served as its full-time organiser.

In December 1956, Moolla, along with 155 others, was arrested on the charge of high treason. He also recalled the support and acts of solidarity with the accused. Money for the bail was raised within hours. The women provided two meals everyday for five years, for all the accused, especially Mrs. Thayanagie Pillay and Dr Zainab Asvat.

Moolla was one of thirty - including Nelson Mandela, Helen Joseph, Ahmed Kathrada and Walter Sisulu - to stand trial for the entire period until 1961. Despite the prosecutors believing that they had a strong chance of conviction, they were all acquitted in March 1961, after being on trial for five years. On 10 May 1963 Moolla was amongst the first to be detained under the newly promulgated 90-day detention law. He was held in solitary confinement at Marshall Square Police Station. He later escaped from the police station along with Abdulhay Jassat, Harold Wolpe and Arthur Goldreich in August 11, 1963 after they were arrested on Liliesleaf Farm in Rivonia with other uMkhonto we Sizwe (MK) high commanders in July 11, 1963 by South African Police.

Moolla then left the country illegally, and made his way to Dar es Salaam, Tanganyika (now Tanzania) which housed the exiled leadership of the African National Congress (ANC).

In 1964, Moolla joined Umkhonto we Sizwe and in 1965 was sent for a year to Odesa Ukraine in the then-Soviet Union for military training. His was the second unit to be sent to Odesa and his group included Josiah Jele (who served on the ANC's National Executive Committee [NEC]), Peter Tladi and Jacqueline Molefe who, after 1994, became a major general in the South African National Defence Force (SANDF). In 1966, after Odesa, Moolla went to Moscow for a six-month stint in intelligence training. On his return to Dar es Salaam, he continued his work within the ANC's Department of Publicity and Information as editor of the ANC's news journal Spotlight on South Africa.

From the time of his escape in 1963 until 1968, the apartheid state denied Moolla's wife, Zubeida, and their children, Tasneem and Azaad, passports. Finally in 1968, they were granted passports and travelled by train to Lusaka, Zambia.

Moolla joined them for a few days at Tunduma, at the Tanzania-Zambia border. This was the first time that Moolla saw his son, who was born two months after he fled the country. Azaad was five years old, and his daughter, Tasneem was six years old. After the brief reunion Moolla returned to Dar es Salaam and Zubeida to Lusaka with the children. Zubeida, could not obtain a work permit in Zambia, and was forced to send the children back to South Africa to live with her parents because she could not support them. This separation was very painful for all of them.

In 1969, Moolla was deployed to Bombay to work amongst South African students studying in India. The ANC's Asian mission was located in New Delhi with Mendi Msimang as its chief representative and Molvi Cachalia as the deputy chief representative. In 1971 Molvi Cachalia retired and Moolla was appointed in his place. In 1972 Mendi was transferred to Tanzania and Moolla took over as chief representative.

In 1978, Moolla was sent to head the ANC's Egypt and Middle East mission. He was also concurrently the ANC representative to the Afro-Asian People's Solidarity Organisation (AAPSO). In 1982, he was reposted to New Delhi. In November 1989, he was deployed as the ANC representative to the World Peace Council, and had to relocate to Helsinki, Finland.

In 1978, Moolla was posted to Cairo as ANC Chief Representative in Egypt and the Middle East and concurrently as ANC representative on the Permanent Secretariat of the Afro-Asian Peoples Solidarity Organisation.

In December 1990, after 28 years in exile, Moolla returned to South Africa. He was employed by the ANC's Department of International Affairs based in Shell House.

In 1991, he was elected as secretary of the TIC and served as a member of the TIC/NIC delegation to the Convention for a Democratic South Africa (CODESA).

In 1995, President Mandela appointed Moolla as the South African ambassador to the Islamic Republic of Iran. He held the post until 1999. From June 2000 until 2004, Moolla was appointed High Commissioner to Pakistan.

Zubeida (née Saloojee), Moolla's wife and life-long partner died on 3 April 2008. They were married for close to 47 years. Besides Tasneem and Azaad, he had another son, Afzal, who was born in New Delhi, India in 1972.

Nelson Mandela gave his daughter, Tasneem, her middle name Nobandla, which means “she of the masses”.

In 2013, the South African Government conferred The Order of Luthuli in Silver on Moosa (Mosie) Moolla for his dauntless and excellent work in the liberation movement often at great risk to his life and for representing the interests of the liberation movement and South Africa in the international community.

== Death ==
He died on 25 March 2023 at the ages of 88 years. He was laid to rest on the following day at West Park Cemetery.
