= Arthur Goldreich =

Jewish-South African anti-apartheid and Zionist activist

- Born: Arthur Joseph Goldreich; 25 December 1929; Johannesburg, Transvaal, Union of South Africa
- Died: 24 May 2011 (aged 81); Tel Aviv, Israel
- Education: University of the Witwatersrand; Haifa Technion
- Occupations: Painter, architect, professor
- Known for: Anti-apartheid activism
- Spouses: Hazel Berman (divorced) Tamar de Shalit (m. 1966; death 2009)
- Children: 4
- Awards: South African Jewish Board of Deputies human rights award (2011)

Arthur Goldreich (25 December 1929 – 24 May 2011) was a South African-Israeli abstract painter, architect, professor and a key figure in the anti-apartheid movement in the country of his birth.

As a young man, he participated in the 1948 Arab-Israeli war as a member of the Palmach, the elite military wing of the Haganah.

He later forged a successful career as a painter in South Africa and designer of department stores. He became increasingly active in the anti-apartheid struggle and in 1963 was arrested during a raid at Lilliesleaf Farm. He escaped from the Old Fort prison in Johannesburg while on remand.

He returned to live in Israel in 1964, where he spent the remainder of his life. His professional focus shifted from art towards design and urban planning and he became a prominent figure at Bezalel Academy in Jerusalem. He and his second wife, Tamar de Shalit, became prominent contributors to Israel's emerging culture of commemoration, designing monuments and memorial sites.

== Early life ==
Goldreich was born in Johannesburg, Union of South Africa to Jewish parents with roots in Eastern Europe and England. He was raised in Pietersburg. His father worked as a furniture dealer and died when Arthur was 15 years old. As a youth, he identified with Zionism and at the age of 19 migrated to Mandatory Palestine in 1948. He lived on Kibbutz Ma'ayan Baruch in the Upper Galilee and joined the Jewish liberation struggle. He participated in the 1948 Arab-Israeli war as a member of the Palmach, the elite military wing of the Haganah.

He studied architecture at Haifa Technion in Haifa for one year, before continuing his studies at the University of the Witwatersrand in Johannesburg.

He established a successful career as a painter in South Africa, exhibiting at the Venice Biennale. In 1955, he won South Africa's Best Young Painter Award for his figures in black and white, but to the Prime Minister Hendrik Verwoerd's government, he was a key suspect in the clandestine operations of the anti-apartheid underground. He also became increasingly engaged in designing department stores in South Africa.

In 1959, he was the set designer and costume designer for King King, a musical theatre production. The production, which featured Miriam Makeba, was significant as the first production by black actors and musicians during the apartheid era.

== Anti-apartheid activism ==
According to South African-Israeli academic, Dr. Louise Bethlehem, it was during his work on King Kong that Goldreich was recruited by Joe Slovo to join uMkhonto weSizwe, the paramilitary wing of the African National Congress. His theatre and costume design skills were allegedly used to assist in camouflaging the underground movement. This has been disputed by Goldreich's son, Amos, who claims that his father was recruited by Nelson Mandela due to his combat experience with the Palmach in Israel. Mandela and Goldreich read Menachem Begin's book "The Revolt" together to gain insight into camouflage tactics.

=== Escape from jail ===
Goldreich and Harold Wolpe, a lawyer, used South African Communist Party funds to buy Liliesleaf Farm in Rivonia for use as a secret meeting place by leaders of the banned African National Congress (ANC) and its armed wing, Umkhonto we Sizwe. The farm had the cover story of being a family home for Goldreich, his wife, Hazel and their children. Goldreich and Wolpe also helped locate sabotage sites for Umkhonto we Sizwe, and draft a disciplinary code for guerrillas.

In 1963, Liliesleaf Farm was raided by the police, leading to the arrest of most of the ANC leadership, including Goldreich and Hazel. Wolpe was arrested shortly after the raid and was held with Goldreich at Marshall Square prison in the city.

The two met up with Moosa Moolla and Abdulhay Jassat, members of the Natal Indian Congress, allied to the African National Congress. Moolla and Jassat had been held in solitary confinement, where they had been tortured (they were believed to be the first political activists tortured in South African jails). Eventually the four men, working together with the aid of a prison warden, escaped successfully from custody, splitting up outside the prison (with Goldreich disguised as a priest).

Wolpe and Goldreich spent several days hiding in and around Johannesburg's suburbs to avoid capture. Eventually, they were driven to Swaziland, and from there were flown to Botswana, still disguised as priests to avoid being identified by potentially pro-South African British colonial authorities (at this time Swaziland was not independent).

== Return to Israel ==
Goldreich returned to Israel in the 1964 and settled in Herzliya until the end of his life.

He maintained his anti-apartheid activities in Israel and campaigned against the death penalty for the Rivonia Trial defendants. He founded an organisation of Israelis against apartheid and organised a protest in Tel Aviv with Martin Buber and Haim Hazaz.

Goldreich's escape made him a heroic figure among senior ANC leadership, Nelson Mandela and Walter Sisulu. He otherwise became isolated as he chose not to stay in London, a centre for exiled members of the underground. His decision to settle in Israel was unpopular with some Muslims in the movement.

In Israel his professional focus shifted from art towards design and urban planning. He designed residential dwellings, as well as interiors and stage sets for political theatre productions. He had a long, tenured career as professor at Bezalel Academy, part of the Hebrew University of Jerusalem. In 1966, he became the head of Industrial and Environmental Design Department, which he helped transform into an internationally recognized center for design.

As Israel's culture of commemoration emerged in the 1960s and 1970s, he and his wife, the interior designer, Tamar de Shalit, became significant contributors. This period saw the burgeoning creation of monuments, cultural centres and memorials in cities and kibbutzim around the country. A proliferation of their designs were created in the border communities.

As an artist, Goldreich had a solo show at Gordon Gallery in Tel Aviv in 1966.

In 1967, he and de Shalit designed the furniture and interiors for the new Shin Bet building in Tel Aviv, designed by Nahum Zolotov. In the same year, the couple designed the Eshel Hotel in Herzliya in the Brutalist style.

In 1972, Goldreich was commissioned to paint a mural on the walls of a pilots club on an Israel Defence Force base.

In the late 1970s, the couple designed a home for Rashad al-Shawwa, mayor of Gaza City.

He brought a political lens to design, and in the 1970s organised research visits with his students to refugee camps in the Gaza strip. In the 1980s and until the First Intifada in 1987, he brought his students on field trips to East Jerusalem to explore coexistence through planning and infrastructure.

Goldreich decided to remain in Israel when apartheid ended in his native South Africa. He faced criticism for not returning permanently but was invited to take part in events with Mandela and his South African passport was restored.

In a 2006 interview with The Guardian, by February 2006, Goldreich was critical of Israeli governments. Following his death, The Jerusalem Post spoke to his long-time friends in Israel, who explained that Goldreich held liberal views, but was not an activist nor did he attend protests, adding: "He was a Zionist, he loved this country, and anybody who says he was anti-Israel is totally wrong,”

== Personal life ==
Goldreich was married twice. In South Africa, he married Hazel Berman, who had been involved in the Young Communist League of South Africa. The couple had two sons together, Paul and Nicholas. They divorced shortly after moving to Israel in 1964, with Berman raising their sons in London.

In 1966, married Tamar de Shalit, an interior designer and sister of Israel Prize laureate Amos de-Shalit. The wedding was attended by Moshe Dayan, Teddy Kollek, Ariel Sharon, the architect Yaakov Rechter and actress Hannah Maron. The couple had one child together, a son, Amos Goldreich, an architect.

Goldreich is also survived by his fourth son, Eden Almog-Goldreich.

== Legacy ==
In 2011, the South African Jewish Board of Deputies posthumously awarded him the board's annual human rights award. He was again honored by the board in 2024, at its 120th anniversary gala dinner, where he was honoured among 100 remarkable Jewish South Africans who have contributed to South Africa. The ceremony included speeches from Chief Rabbi Ephraim Mirvis, and Goldreich was honoured with other anti-apartheid activists, Helen Suzman, Ruth First, Rusty Bernstein and Joe Slovo.

In June 2018, Herzliya Museum of Contemporary Art hosted an exhibition of items from Goldreich and de Shalit's collection. It was curated by Zvi Elhyani, a former design student of Goldreich, and Talia Davidi.
