= Percy Yutar =

South African lawyer (1911–2002)

Percy Yutar (29 July 1911 – 13 July 2002) was a South African lawyer who became the country's first Jewish attorney-general. He was the state prosecutor in the Rivonia trial in which anti-apartheid activist Nelson Mandela and seven others were convicted of sabotage and sentenced to life imprisonment.

== Early life ==
Percy Yutar was born in the Cape Town suburb of Woodstock to parents who had emigrated to South Africa from the ghettos of Lithuania, like the majority of the country's once-large Jewish community. His father's original surname was "Yuter". As a young man, he worked in his father's butcher's shop.

Yutar attended the University of Cape Town on a scholarship, and in 1937 received his doctorate in law. Despite his education, given the prevalence of antisemitism in South Africa at the time, he had to work, for five years, in a lowly legal position at the post office. In 1940, he was appointed a junior state prosecutor and eventually become Deputy Attorney General, first in the Orange Free State, and later in the Transvaal.

== The Rivonia trial and apartheid ==
Yutar was the prosecutor in the 1963 Rivonia Trial against Nelson Mandela and nine others. Yutar charged the defendants with sabotage and conspiracy, instead of the more serious crime of treason. Mandela and seven others were convicted and two were acquitted. During sentencing, Yutar argued that the full weight of the law should be brought to bear on the defendants, but did not specify whether he believed the defendants should be executed or sentenced to prison. Since the death penalty was rarely used for sabotage and conspiracy, Justice Quartus de Wet sentenced the defendants to life in prison. Anti-apartheid activists condemned the guilty verdict, but were relieved that Mandela had not been charged with treason and would not be executed.

During the trial, Yutar brutally cross-examined some of the defendants. Yutar even carried out a hostile cross-examination of Alan Paton, who had appeared in mitigation of sentence. Yutar accused the defendants of telling lies to the world that Africans in South Africa were oppressed. In truth, he said, Africans were peaceful, law-abiding and loyal to the regime.

After the sentencing and conclusion of the trial, Yutar was lionised in the media as South Africa's saviour, the defender of civilisation against the forces of darkness. He encouraged this image by stoking white fears of an imminent bloodbath. The minister of justice, John Vorster, lauded him as a true patriot, while he was vilified by anti-apartheid activists, such as the African National Congress, which he denounced as a communist-dominated terrorist organisation that had misled the black masses. South Africa's security forces held him in high regard. Benjamin Pogrund, former deputy-editor of The Rand Daily Mail in Johannesburg, confirmed that Yutar "was loved by the security police. They told me they loved him because he did their bidding. What they wanted, he did, including all his histrionics in court." Yutar was said to be indifferent towards apartheid.

Years later, after the end of apartheid, Yutar claimed that his decision to charge the defendants with sabotage instead of treason had saved their lives. In his last recorded interview, he stated: "If I had merely even asked for the death penalty, the judge would have granted... They would have been named martyrs and that would have led to a hellish revolution, and a bloody civil war. And I have not the slightest doubt that I acted correctly, and saved this country." George Bizos, one of the trial's defence lawyers, called the statement self-aggrandising and highlighting his own role. The crime, as judge de Wet clarified in his closing remarks, was "in essence one of high treason", and the heavy political considerations involved in the potential martyring the leading opponents of the regime were out of Yutar's hands.

Mandela was released from prison in 1990. Negotiations to end apartheid culminated in South Africa's first free elections in 1994, in which Mandela and the African National Congress won a large majority, and Mandela became president. In 1995, President Mandela invited Yutar to a Kosher lunch, and allegedly said that Yutar "was simply doing his duty" as expected of him as state prosecutor.

== Legacy ==
Yutar was a controversial figure whose "vengeful and forbidding image as a relentless opponent of the anti-apartheid struggle contrasted with his private persona as a gentle and devoted husband and father, who loved classical music."

For 11 years, Yutar served as chairman of the United Hebrew Congregation, a collection of Orthodox synagogues in Johannesburg.

== In popular culture ==
In the 2017 film An Act of Defiance, which follows the story of defence lawyer Bram Fischer in the Rivonia trial, Yutar was portrayed by actor José Domingos. Fischer and others in Mandela's defence team initially believe that Yutar's Jewish background would help their clients. However, in one scene, Yutar complains that Mandela's Jewish co-defendants (whom he calls "Jewish terrorists") placed the Jewish community at risk of violence from white South Africans.

== See also ==
- History of the Jews in South Africa
