= Quartus de Wet =

South African judge (1899–1980)

The Honourable Quartus de Wet QC

Judge President of the Transvaal Provincial Division of the Supreme Court of South Africa
- In office 1961–1969
- Preceded by: Frans Rumpff
- Succeeded by: P. M. Cillié

Judge of the Transvaal Provincial Division of the Supreme Court of South Africa
- In office 1950–1961

Personal details
- Born: Nicolaas Jacobus Quartus de Wet; 10 March 1899 Pretoria, South African Republic
- Died: 18 December 1980 (aged 81)
- Relations: Nicolaas Jacobus de Wet (father)
- Education: Transvaal University College; University of Cape Town
- Profession: Advocate

Quartus de Wet (10 March 1899 – 18 December 1980) was a South African judge who served as Judge President of the Transvaal Provincial Division of the Supreme Court of South Africa.

== Early life and education ==
Born in 1899 in Pretoria, he was the son of Nicolaas Jacobus de Wet, Chief Justice of South Africa and acting Governor-General, and Ella Scheepers (his first wife), who is reputed to have composed the popular Afrikaans song Sarie Marais during the Anglo-Boer War. De Wet matriculated at Pretoria Boys' High School and attended the Transvaal University College and University of Cape Town, where he graduated with BA and LLB degrees.

== Career ==
In 1922, De Wet was admitted as an advocate (the South African equivalent of a barrister) to the bar of Pretoria and after twenty three years in practice, in 1945, he took silk. He became a judge of the Transvaal Provincial Division in 1950, and he became the Judge President in 1961.

He is famous for presiding over the 1963 Rivonia Trial of Nelson Mandela and other anti-apartheid activists. During the Rivonia Trial, de Wet sentenced Mandela and other anti-apartheid activists to life imprisonment, instead of a possible death sentence, for sabotage as a result of the trial, and he noted as he passed sentence:

The crime of which the accused have been convicted, that is the main crime, the crime of conspiracy, is in essence one of high treason. The state has decided not to charge the crime in this form. Bearing this in mind and giving the matter very serious consideration I have decided not to impose the supreme penalty which in a case like this would usually be the proper penalty for the crime, but consistent with my duty that is the only leniency which I can show. The sentence in the case of all the accused will be one of life imprisonment.

De Wet retired in 1969, and died in 1980; he did not (unlike the prosecutor, Percy Yutar) live to see Mandela's release in 1990.

== See also ==
- List of Judges President of the Gauteng Division of the High Court of South Africa
