= Abdulhay Jassat =

South African political activist

Abdulhay Jassat (born 12 June 1934), also known as Charlie Jassat, is a South African political activist who was imprisoned following the Rivonia Trial. He was tortured in prison. He later escaped from prison alongside Arthur Goldreich, Moosa Moolla, and Harold Wolpe. He was awarded the Order of Luthuli.
