= Raymond Mhlaba =

Anti-apartheid activist and politician from South Africa (1920–2005)

Premier of the Eastern Cape
- In office 7 May 1994 – 4 February 1997
- Preceded by: Position Established
- Succeeded by: Makhenkesi Stofile

High Commissioner to Uganda and Rwanda
- In office 1997–2001
- President: Nelson Mandela; Thabo Mbeki

Overall Commander of Umkhonto weSizwe
- In office August 1962 – July 1963
- Preceded by: Nelson Mandela
- Succeeded by: Wilton Mkwayi

Personal details
- Born: Raymond Mphakamisi Mhlaba; 12 February 1920 Fort Beaufort, Cape Province (now Eastern Cape), South Africa
- Died: 20 February 2005 (aged 85)
- Party: African National Congress; South African Communist Party
- Spouse(s): Joyce Meke (m. 1943; died 1960) Dideka Heliso (m. 1986)
- Children: 8 children including: Bukeka Mhlaba (daughter); Nomalungelo Mhlaba (daughter); Jongintshaba Mhlaba (son); Mpilo Mhlaba (son); Nomawethu Mhlaba (daughter); Nikiwe Mhlaba (daughter)

Raymond Mphakamisi Mhlaba OMSG (12 February 1920 – 20 February 2005) was an anti-apartheid activist, Communist and leader of the African National Congress (ANC) who became the first premier of the Eastern Cape. Mhlaba spent 25 years of his life in prison. Well-known for being sentenced with Nelson Mandela, Govan Mbeki, Walter Sisulu and others in the Rivonia Trial, he was an active member of the ANC and the South African Communist Party (SACP) all his adult life. His kindly manner brought him the nickname "Oom Ray” (“Uncle Ray” in Afrikaans).

== Personal life ==
Mhlaba was born in Mazoka village in the Fort Beaufort district, Eastern Cape and was educated at Healdtown Mission Institute but had to drop out because of financial problems. Mhlaba started working at a laundry in Port Elizabeth after leaving school in 1942.

He met and married his first wife, Joyce Meke, who was also from the Fort Beaufort area in 1943. In their 17 years together, before her death in a car accident in 1960, they had three children Bukeka, Nomalungelo and Jongintshaba. In 1982, Mhlaba, who had been a political prisoner in Robben Island since 1964, was transferred to Pollsmoor Prison where he received special permission to marry his common-law wife Dideka Heliso in 1986, with whom he had three children Mpilo, Nomawethu and Nikiwe.

== Early political career ==
Mhlaba started working at a laundry in Port Elizabeth after leaving school in 1942. The horrendous conditions at the laundry converted him to a trade unionist and he became the leader of Non European Laundry Workers Union in 1943. In 1943, he joined the South African Communist Party, serving as the party's district secretary from 1946 until the party was banned in 1950. In 1944, he became a member of the African National Congress. From 1944 Mhlaba maintained dual membership of the ANC and the SACP. He rose through the ANC ranks becoming the chairman of the Port Elizabeth branch of the ANC from 1947 to 1953, and then elected to the Cape Executive committee.

Mhlaba was the first to be arrested for disobeying apartheid laws during the nationwide Defiance Campaign of 1952 together with Govan Mbeki and Vuyisile Mini for three months in Rooi Hel ('Red Hell' or North End Prison, Port Elizabeth). The campaign was launched in Port Elizabeth when Mhlaba led a group of volunteers singing freedom songs through the "Whites Only" entrance of the New Brighton Railway Station. This action earned him the Xhosa nickname "Vulindlela" or "he who opens the way." That same year, Mhlaba was charged under South Africa's Suppression of Communism Act. Although his political activities continued, he was barred from attending meetings or gatherings.

Before leaving he assisted Mandela in writing the Umkhonto constitution. In 1962, Mhlaba returned to South Africa, becoming a commander of the MK after Nelson Mandela's arrest.

After the ANC was banned on 8 April under the Unlawful Organisations Act, the party took up the armed struggle forming its military wing Umkhonto we Sizwe. Mhlaba was one of its first recruits and was sent to China for military training. In 1961, he spent ten months in China, studying at the Nanjing Military Academy. During the early 1960s, Mhlaba traveled to the Umkhonto we Sizwe’s military camps in Morocco and Algeria as well as going to other countries to negotiate for military support.

== Rivonia Trial ==
On 11 July 1963 the South African apartheid government raided the ANC's underground headquarters in Rivonia, north of Johannesburg. Mhlaba and 10 other ANC and SACP leaders including Ahmed Kathrada, Walter Sisulu and Govan Mbeki were arrested and Nelson Mandela was already in prison. They were charged with sabotage and conspiracy to overthrow the government. On 9 October 1963, the world-famous Rivonia Trial with all the accused charged with high treason. On 12 June 1964, Mhlaba, Mandela and seven other ANC leaders were sentenced to life imprisonment, and all were sent to Robben Island but the white Denis Goldberg was sent to Pretoria Central Prison instead of Robben Island.

== Struggle from prison ==
During his time in Robben Island, Mhlaba and other ANC members founded the ANC High Command or High Organ with Mandela as its head. The committee educated and supported younger imprisoned members, formulated policies on day-to-day concerns, prisoners' complaints, and strikes, and enforced discipline within their isolation unit. Looking back at their time in Robben Island Mandela said of Mhlaba: "I got to know him as the peacemaker. He spent a lot of time urging fellow prisoners to forget their differences and unite so that conditions for prisoners could improve."

== Release from prison ==
After his release from prison on 15 October 1989, he was elected to the ANC national executive and the South African Communist Party central committee. He became national chairperson of the SACP in 1995.

In January 1994 he was chosen as the ANC's nominee as Premier of the Eastern Cape, and in May 1994 he was elected to that post. He helped to establish the house of traditional leaders. He then became the High Commissioner to Uganda and Rwanda, until he retired in 2001. In April 2001 he released a book of his memoirs, narrated by him and researched and compiled by Thembeka Mafumadi. He was chairperson of a black economic empowerment consortium involved in the Coega port project, but suffered a stroke on 19 July 2003, recovering quickly.

== Death ==
In 2004, Mhlaba was diagnosed with advanced liver cancer, and in December doctors discharged him from a private clinic saying there was nothing they could do for him. On 20 February 2005 he died in hospital. He was granted state funeral on 27 February 2005. Mhlaba is survived by his three sons and five daughters, his wife Dideka Mhlaba having died on 18 January 2010 at the age of 85 years.

== Legacy ==
Mhlaba is seen as a stalwart member of both the ANC and the SACP. He was recognised with the Isitwalandwe Medal in 1992 for his role in the liberation struggle, and the Moses Kotane Award in 2002 for his contribution to the SACP.

The Nkonkobe Local Municipality which includes Alice and Mhlaba's hometown Fort Beaufort was renamed the Raymond Mhlaba Local Municipality. The Raymond Mhlaba Centre for Governance and Leadership at Nelson Mandela University is named in his honor.

Andries Pretorius street, The R30 in Bloemfontein was renamed after Raymond Mhlaba to honour him. There's an ANC branch named after him in Mpumalanga, Nkangala region, sub-region Thembisile Hani ward 11 in Verena.

Political offices
Preceded by Kobus Meiring as Administrator of the Cape Province	Premier of the Eastern Cape; 7 May 1994 – 4 February 1997	Succeeded by Makhenkesi Stofile
Preceded by Oupa Gqozo as Chairman of the Military Committee and of the Council of State of Ciskei	Premier of the Eastern Cape; 7 May 1994 – 4 February 1997	Succeeded by Makhenkesi Stofile
Preceded by Tutor Vulindlela Ndamase as President of Transkei and Bantu Holomisa as Chairman of the Military Council and of the Council of Ministers of Transkei	Premier of the Eastern Cape; 7 May 1994 – 4 February 1997	Succeeded by Makhenkesi Stofile
