= Ahmed Kathrada =

South African politician (1929–2017)

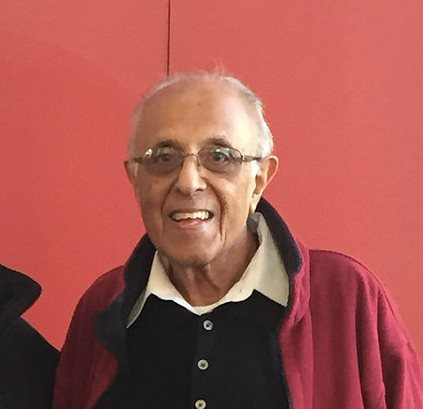
- Kathrada in 2016

Parliamentary Counsellor to the President of South Africa
- In office 10 May 1994 – 16 June 1999
- President: Nelson Mandela

Member of the Parliament of South Africa
- In office 1994–1999
- Constituency: Lenasia

Personal details
- Born: Ahmed Mohamed Kathrada; 21 August 1929 Schweizer-Reneke, Transvaal Province, Union of South Africa
- Died: 28 March 2017 (aged 87) Johannesburg, Gauteng, South Africa
- Party: African National Congress
- Other political affiliations: South African Communist Party
- Spouse: Barbara Hogan
- Education: University of South Africa
- Occupation: Anti-apartheid activist; politician; writer
- Website: kathradafoundation.org
- Nickname: "Kathy"
- Criminal information
- Criminal charges: Sabotage, seditious conspiracy
- Trial: Rivonia trial
- Penalty: Jailed (1964–89)

Ahmed Mohamed Kathrada OMSG (21 August 1929 – 28 March 2017), sometimes known by the nickname "Kathy", was a South African politician and anti-apartheid activist.

Kathrada's involvement in the anti-apartheid activities of the African National Congress (ANC) led him to his long-term imprisonment following the Rivonia Trial, in which he was held at Robben Island and Pollsmoor Prison. Following his release in 1990, he was elected to serve as a member of parliament, representing the ANC. He authored a book, No Bread for Mandela – Memoirs of Ahmed Kathrada, Prisoner No. 468/64.

== Early life ==
Ahmed Kathrada was born on 21 August 1929 in the small country town of Schweizer-Reneke in the Western Transvaal, the fourth of six children in a Gujarati Bohra family of South African Indian immigrant parents from Surat, Gujarat. Once in Johannesburg, he was influenced by leaders of the Transvaal Indian Congress such as Dr. Yusuf Dadoo, IC Meer, Moulvi and Yusuf Cachalia, and JN Singh. Consequently, he became a political activist at the early age of 12 when he joined the Young Communist League of South Africa. He took part in various activities such as handing out leaflets and performing volunteer work in the individual passive resistance against the Pegging Act in 1941. During World War II, he was involved in the anti-war campaign of the Non-European United Front.

== Political activist ==
At the age of 17 he left school to work full-time for the Transvaal Passive Resistance Council in order to work against the Asiatic Land Tenure and Indian Representation Act, commonly referred to as the "Ghetto Act", which sought to give Indians limited political representation and restricted where Indians could live, trade and own land.

Kathrada was one of the two thousand volunteers imprisoned as a result of the campaign; he spent a month in a Durban jail in South Africa. This was his first jail sentence for civil disobedience. Later, he was elected as the chair of the Transvaal Indian Youth Congress.

While Kathrada was a student at the University of the Witwatersrand he was sent as a delegate of the Transvaal Indian Youth Congress to the 3rd World Festival of Youth and Students in East Berlin in 1951. He was elected as the leader of the large multi-racial South African delegation. He remained in Europe in order to attend a congress of the International Union of Students in Warsaw, and finally travelled to Budapest and worked at the headquarters of the World Federation of Democratic Youth for nine months.

As result of the growing co-operation between the African and Indian Congresses in the 1950s, Kathrada came into close contact with African National Congress leaders such as Nelson Mandela and Walter Sisulu. He was one of 156 accused in the four-year Treason Trial which lasted from 1956 to 1960. Eventually, all of the accused were found not guilty.

After the ANC (African National Congregation) and various other anti-apartheid organisations were banned in 1960, Kathrada continued his political activities despite repeated detentions and increasingly severe house arrest measures against him. To be free to continue his activities, Kathrada went underground early in 1962.

== Rivonia Trial ==
On 11 July 1963, Kathrada was arrested at the South African internal headquarters of Umkhonto we Sizwe ("The Spear of the Nation" – the military wing of the ANC) in Rivonia, near Johannesburg. Although Kathrada was not a member of Umkhonto we Sizwe, he became one of the accused in the famous Rivonia Trial, which started in October 1963. He was charged with sabotage and attempting to overthrow the government and to start a guerrilla war.

The trial ended in June 1964; Kathrada was sentenced to life imprisonment along with Nelson Mandela, Walter Sisulu, Govan Mbeki, Andrew Mlangeni, Billy Nair, Elias Motsoaledi, Raymond Mhlaba and Denis Goldberg. Kathy was the youngest prisoner (34 years old, at the time of arrest).

== Imprisonment ==
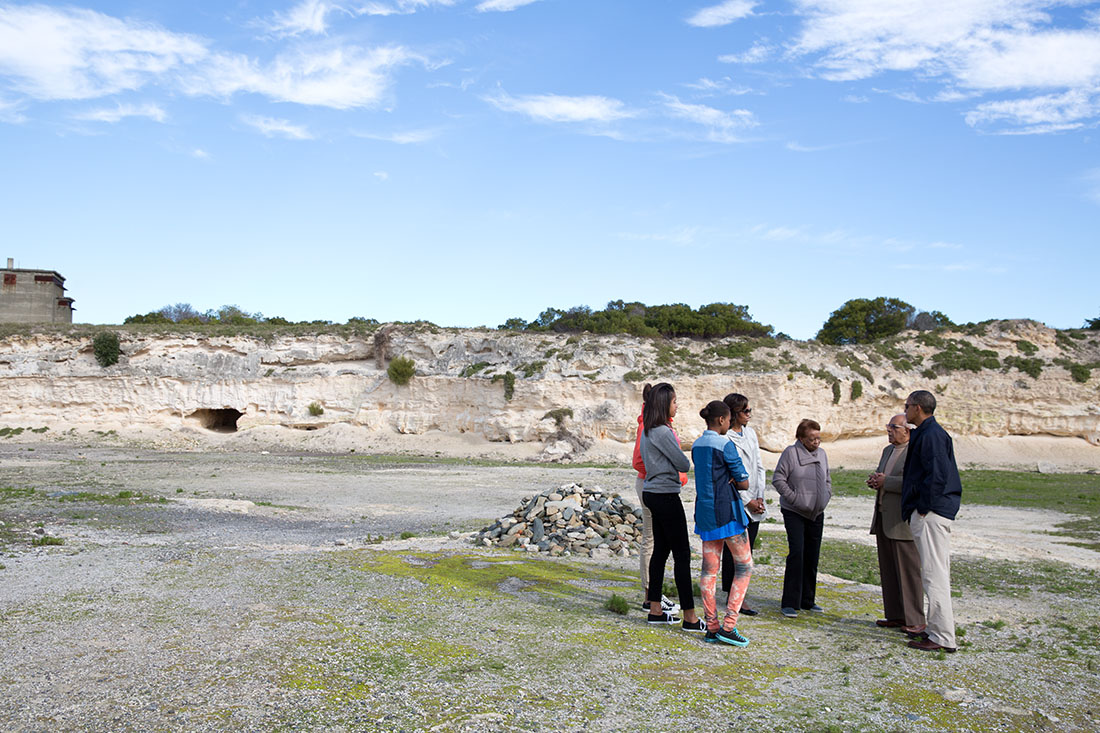
Kathrada giving a tour of Robben Island, where he was imprisoned between 1964 and 1982, to then-U.S. President Barack Obama's family in 2013.

For the following 18 years, Kathrada was confined to the Robben Island Maximum Security Prison off Cape Town along with most of his Rivonia Trial co-defendants. In October 1982, he was moved to Pollsmoor Maximum Security Prison near Cape Town.

While in jail on Robben Island and in Pollsmoor, Kathrada completed a Bachelor's degrees in History/Criminology as well as three other degrees, thanks to his family who paid the tuition fee.

On 15 October 1989 Kathrada, along with Jeff Masemola, Raymond Mhlaba, Billy Nair, Wilton Mkwayi, Andrew Mlangeni, Elias Motsoaledi, Oscar Mpetha, and Walter Sisulu were released from Johannesburg prison.

== Activities after release ==
After the unbanning of the ANC in February 1990, Kathrada served on the interim leadership committees of both the ANC and the South African Communist Party. He resigned from the latter position when he was elected to the ANC National Executive Committee in July 1991. During the same year, he was appointed as head of ANC public relations as well as a fellow of the University of the Western Cape's Mayibuye Centre.

Kathrada went on the Hajj pilgrimage to Mecca in 1992.

In the first all-inclusive democratic South African elections in 1994, Kathrada was elected as a member of parliament for the ANC. After refusing to accept a position in Mandela's cabinet as minister of correctional services stating that "I joined the struggle not for positions" in September 1994 he was appointed as the political advisor to President Mandela in the newly created post of Parliamentary Counsellor. In June 1999, Kathrada left parliamentary politics.

In 1994 and 1995, Kathrada was elected as chairperson of the Robben Island Council. He remained the chairperson of the Robben Island Museum Council. On 27 October 2013, on the island, he launched the International Campaign to Free Marwan Barghouti and All Palestinian Prisoners.

Kathrada married Barbara Hogan, former anti-apartheid activist who was imprisoned for nine years, later Minister of Health and then Minister of Public Enterprises in the ANC government.

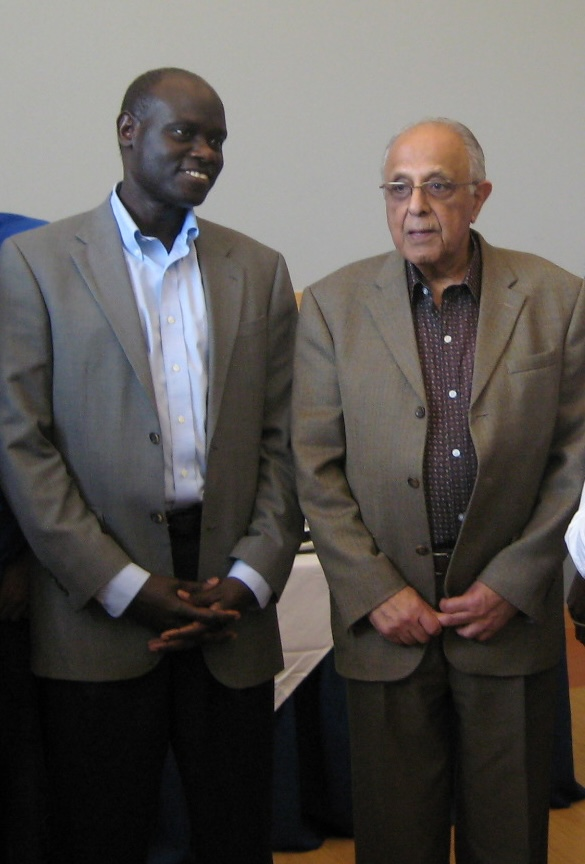
Kathrada at the UNESCO Global Intergenerational Leadership Development Conference at the University of Connecticut, with Amii Omara-Otunnu, who holds the UNESCO Chair in Comparative Human Rights at UConn

In 2008, he was invited to be the keynote speaker at the UNESCO Global Intergenerational Leadership Development Conference at the University of Connecticut in Hartford, Connecticut, held from 2–11 August. The annual conference is hosted by the UNESCO Chair and Institute of Comparative Human Rights. In his address, given on 4 August 2008, Kathrada spoke of what he had learnt from Nelson Mandela when both incarcerated on Robben Island. Many in the audience of 75 young people from 55 countries, were reported to be "spellbound by Kathrada’s courage, humility and sacrifice". Amii Omara-Otunnu, who holds the UNESCO Chair in Comparative Human Rights at UConn, commented afterwards that Kathrada was "a great person because he carries himself with humility".

Also in 2008, he founded the Ahmed Kathrada Foundation to continue his life's work.

In 2017, Kathrada appeared along with remaining surviving co-defendants at the Rivonia Trial, Andrew Mlangeni and Denis Goldberg, along with lawyers Joel Joffe, George Bizos, and Denis Kuny in a documentary film entitled Life is Wonderful, directed by Nicholas Stadlen, which tells the story of the trial. The title reflects Goldberg's words to his mother at the end of the trial on hearing that he and his comrades had been spared the death sentence.

== Death and legacy ==
Kathrada died at a medical centre in Johannesburg from complications of a cerebral embolism on 28 March 2017, aged 87. He was buried the next day in Johannesburg in accordance with Islamic rites at Westpark Cemetery where his funeral also took place there. The BBC described the funeral as "simple" with "nothing lavish or grand" in sight, and there was a tent "filled with people" who paid their last tribute. His funeral was attended by veterans of the struggle for freedom, ANC stalwarts, South African politicians, civil society and ordinary South Africans. Notable mourners were Former President Thabo Mbeki, Deputy President Cyril Ramaphosa, last two remaining Rivonia trialists Denis Goldberg and Andrew Mlangeni, last two remaining Little Rivonia Trialists Laloo Chiba and Mac Maharaj, former South African lawyer of Rivonia trialists and little Rivonia Trialist George Bizos, Graca Machel, Winnie Mandela, Sophia De Bruyn, EFF leader Julius Malema, including the Gauteng Premier David Makhura who made welcoming and the Former President Kgalema Motlanthe who was keynote speaker for the funeral and the Minister of Finance Pravin Gordhan who was given a resounding applause by everyone due to his fight against corruption led by president Zuma and the Gupta Famil. President Jacob Zuma, Kathrada's opponent, did not attend the funeral in accordance with the family's wishes.

Zuma ordered the South African flag to be flown at half-mast to mark Kathrada's death and postponed a cabinet meeting in order to allow cabinet members to attend the funeral.

As of 2026 the Ahmed Kathrada Foundation continues.

The Ahmed Kathrada Award of Excellence is awarded by the Congress of Business and Economics.

== Honours and awards ==
In addition to receiving the Isitwalandwe Award (the ANC's highest possible accolade) whilst still in prison in 1988, Kathrada has also been awarded four Honorary Doctorates, including the University of Massachusetts Amherst (2000), the University of Missouri, Michigan State University, and the University of Kentucky.

Kathrada was voted 46th in the Top 100 Great South Africans in 2004.

He was awarded the Pravasi Bharatiya Samman by the Ministry of Overseas Indian Affairs in 2005.

On 18 July 2011, he and his wife were the chief guests on Nelson Mandela International Day at the United Nations Information Centre for India and Bhutan, where he shared his views with children.

== See also ==
- Pravasi Bharatiya Samman
- Pravasi Bharatiya Divas
- Ahmed Kathrada Foundation
