= Andrew Mlangeni =

South African anti-apartheid activist and politician (1925–2020)

Personal details
- Born: Andrew Mokete Mlangeni; 6 June 1925 Bethlehem, Orange Free State, Union of South Africa (now South Africa)
- Died: 21 July 2020 (aged 95) Pretoria, South Africa
- Party: ANC
- Spouse: June Ledwaba (m. 1950; died 2001)
- Children: 4 children including: Sello Mlangeni (son); Sylvia Mlangeni (daughter); Moraine Mlangeni (daughter)

Andrew Mokete Mlangeni (6 June 1925 – 21 July 2020), also known as Percy Mokoena, Mokete Mokoena, and Rev. Mokete Mokoena, was a South African political activist and anti-apartheid campaigner who, along with Nelson Mandela and others, was imprisoned after the Rivonia Trial.

== Early life ==
Mlangeni was born in Bethlehem, Orange Free State. After having to give up his studies owing to poverty, after 1946 he experienced worker exploitation as a factory worker. When working as a bus driver, he was active in a strike for better working conditions and a living wage, and in 1951, joined the African National Congress Youth League (ANCYL). In 1954, he joined the African National Congress (ANC). In 1961, he was sent for military training outside the country, but on his return in 1963 was arrested, after being accused of recruiting and training an armed force. He was found guilty in the Rivonia Trial and sentenced to life imprisonment on Robben Island, where he was Prisoner 467/64.

== Later life ==
Mlangeni was released from prison in October 1989 after having served 26 years of his life sentence. Mlangeni served as a member of parliament for the ANC from 1994 to 1999. He served once more in the National Assembly from 2009 to 2014, when he retired. He was close friends with Nelson Mandela and spoke at Mandela's memorial service at FNB Stadium.

In 2015, director Lebogang Rasethaba made a film about Mlangeni, Prisoner 467/64: The Untold Legacy of Andrew Mlangeni.

In 2017, Mlangeni appeared with fellow defendants at the Rivonia Trial, Denis Goldberg and Ahmed Kathrada, along with lawyers Joel Joffe, George Bizos and Denis Kuny in a documentary film entitled Life is Wonderful, directed by Sir Nicholas Stadlen, which tells the story of the trial. (The title reflects Goldberg's words to his mother at the end of the trial on hearing that he and his comrades had been spared the death sentence).

On 26 April 2018, Mlangeni received an Honorary Doctorate in Education from the Durban University of Technology in South Africa. He was also awarded an honorary doctorate in Law on 7 April 2018 by Rhodes University.

Mlangeni was awarded the Freedom of the City of London on 20 July 2018 at age 93. On that visit, he was also a guest of honour at the opening of the Mandela Centenary Exhibition at the South Bank Centre, alongside the Duke and Duchess of Sussex. On the Centenary Celebration of Nelson Mandela's birth, he also read Mandela's favourite poem – Invictus – which was aired on the BBC's Newsnight programme.

In 2019, the South African Irish Regiment was renamed in his honour.

== Personal life ==
He married June Ledwaba (22 March 1927 – 24 May 2001) from 1950 until her death in 2001 from cancer. The couple had four children.

== Death ==
Mlangeni died on 21 July 2020 in 1 Military Hospital in Pretoria after complaining of abdominal related issues. He was 95 and was the last surviving Rivonia Trialist following the death of Denis Goldberg on 29 April same year. President Cyril Ramaphosa expressed his condolences on behalf of the government, stating: "The passing of Andrew Mokete Mlangeni signifies the end of a generational history and places our future squarely in our hands".
He was given a special state funeral on 29 July 2020 and he was buried at Roodepoort cemetery next to his wife June.
