= Walter Sisulu =

South African anti-apartheid activist (1912–2003)

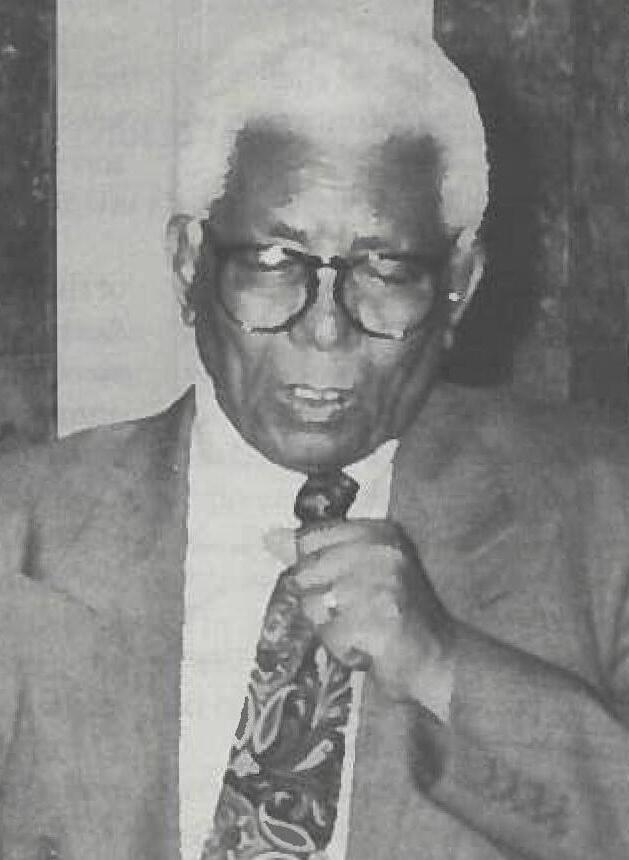
- Sisulu in 1991

5th Deputy President of the African National Congress
- In office 7 July 1991 – 20 December 1994
- President: Nelson Mandela
- Preceded by: Nelson Mandela
- Succeeded by: Thabo Mbeki

9th Secretary-General of the African National Congress
- In office 1949–1955
- President: James Moroka; Albert Luthuli
- Preceded by: James Calata
- Succeeded by: Oliver Tambo

Personal details
- Born: Walter Max Ulyate Sisulu; 18 May 1912 Ngcobo, South Africa
- Died: 5 May 2003 (aged 90) Soweto, South Africa
- Party: African National Congress
- Other political affiliations: South African Communist Party (Tripartite Alliance)
- Spouse: Albertina Thetiwe (m. 1944)
- Children: 5, including Max, Mlungisi, Zwelakhe, and Lindiwe
- Occupation: Politician; activist
- Awards: Isitwalandwe Medal (1992); Padma Vibushan (1998)

Walter Max Ulyate Sisulu (18 May 1912 – 5 May 2003) was a South African anti-apartheid activist and member of the African National Congress (ANC). Between terms as ANC Secretary-General (1949–1954) and ANC Deputy President (1991–1994), he was Accused No.2 in the Rivonia Trial and was incarcerated on Robben Island where he served more than 25 years' imprisonment for his anti-Apartheid revolutionary activism. He had a close partnership with Oliver Tambo and Nelson Mandela, with whom he played a key role in organising the 1952 Defiance Campaign and the establishment of the ANC Youth League and Umkhonto we Sizwe. He was also on the Central Committee of the South African Communist Party.

== Family ==
Walter Sisulu was born in 1912 in the town of Ngcobo in the Union of South Africa, part of what is now the Eastern Cape province (then the Transkei). As was not unusual for his generation in South Africa, he was uncertain of his birthday, but celebrated it on 18 May. His mother, Alice Mase Sisulu, was a Xhosa domestic worker and his father, Albert Victor Dickinson, was a white civil servant and magistrate. Dickinson did not play a part in his son's upbringing: Sisulu reportedly met him only once, in the 1940s, before he died in the 1970s. Sisulu and his sister, Rosabella, were raised by his mother's family, who were descended from the Thembu clan. He was close with his uncle, Dyantyi Hlakula, who was passionate about Xhosa culture and who oversaw his initiation. Although he was technically of mixed race, Sisulu identified strongly as black and as Xhosa.

In his mid-teens, Sisulu left school – an Anglican mission school – to find work. In Johannesburg, he worked a range of jobs, including as a bank teller, gold miner, domestic worker, and baker. He was fired from the bakery for trying to organise his co-workers.

He founded Sitha Investments in 1939. It was situated at Barclay Arcade between West Street and Commissioner Street in the business district of Johannesburg. Its objective was to help black and Indian people buy houses. During its operations, Sitha was the only black-owned real estate agency in South Africa.

== Political career ==
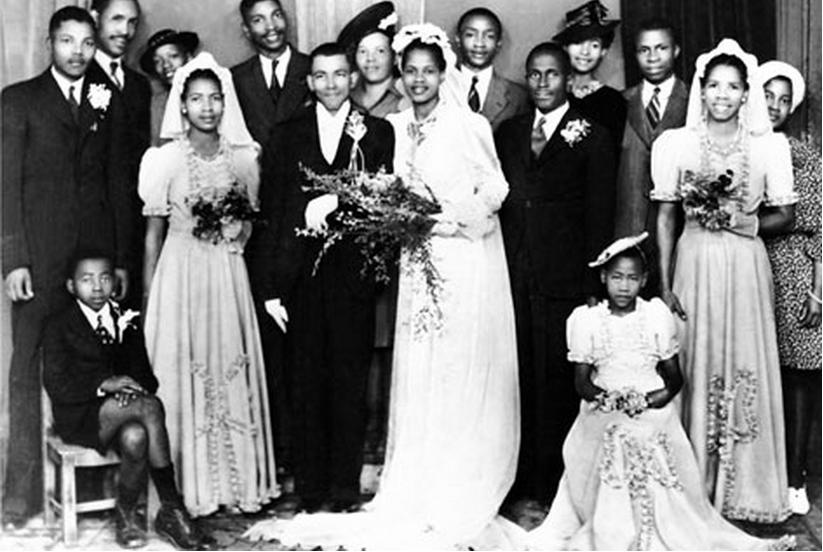
Sisulu's wedding to Albertina in 1944. Evelyn Mase is to the left of the groom, with Nelson Mandela beside her on the far left. Anton Lembede is to the right of the bride. Walter's sister, Rosabella, looks out over the couple.

Sisulu was one of the first ANC leaders to push for a non-racial alliance, leading to cooperation with white and Indian activists like Joe Slovo and Ahmed Kathrada. His work laid the groundwork for the “Rainbow Nation” ideal.

In 1940, Sisulu joined the African National Congress (ANC), which had been founded in the year of his birth. The following year, Nelson Mandela moved to Johannesburg and was introduced to Sisulu, who by then was well connected among the city's activist class. Sisulu later said, ''I had no hesitation, the moment I met him, that this is the man I need" – the man, that is, "for leading the African people". Sisulu encouraged Mandela to join the ANC, occasionally contributed to his law school tuition, and introduced him to his first wife, Evelyn Mase, who was Sisulu's maternal relative.

=== 1944–1961: Youth League ===
In 1943, together with Mandela and Oliver Tambo, he joined the ANC Youth League, founded by Anton Lembede, of which Sisulu was initially the treasurer. He later distanced himself from Lembede, who died in 1947, had ridiculed his parentage.

The Youth League's drive for a more militant posture was given further fuel in 1948, when the National Party (NP) won national elections on a platform of legislating apartheid. In December 1949, at the ANC's 38th National Conference, the Youth League leadership carried out a "remarkable putsch", which successfully installed several younger and more militant members onto the party's National Executive Committee – including Sisulu, who was elected ANC Secretary-General. The League also tabled a broad Programme of Action, which was notable for its explicit emphasis on African nationalism and mass mobilisation techniques. The culmination of this new strategy was the 1952 Defiance Campaign of passive resistance. Sisulu was on the planning council for the campaign and was arrested for his participation. In December, he and other organisers, including ANC President James Moroka, were found guilty of "statutory communism" under the remarkably broad Suppression of Communism Act, but had their sentences – nine months' imprisonment with hard labour – suspended for two years.

Sisulu, along with several others, formed part of an ANC delegation to the 1953 World Democratic Youth meeting in Bucharest, Romania; before returning to South Africa, the group also travelled to Warsaw, Poland, to London, to Israel, and to the People's Republic of China, where Sisulu was part of a meeting with the Chinese Communist Party leadership. In 1955, Sisulu, Mandela, and Ahmed Kathrada watched the Congress of the People gathering – which adopted the Freedom Charter – from a nearby rooftop, unable to attend the meeting because of the banning orders against them. By this time, Sisulu was active not only in the ANC but also, covertly, in the South African Communist Party (SACP).

=== 1961–1963: Umkhonto we Sizwe ===
Paul Landau, a historian of the ANC, has argued that Sisulu and Mandela were the crucial forces, both intellectually and practically, behind the ANC's "turn to violence" (that is, to armed struggle against the government) at the turn of the decade. When Umkhonto we Sizwe was established in 1961, Sisulu served on its High Command.

After 1952, he was jailed seven times in the next ten years, including five months in 1960, and was held under house arrest in 1962. At the Treason Trial (1956–1961), he was eventually sentenced to six years, but was released on bail pending his appeal.

=== 1963–1964: Rivonia Trial ===
He went underground in 1963, resulting in his wife, Albertina Sisulu, becoming the first woman to be arrested under the so-called 90 Day Act, the General Laws Amendment Act of 1963, which allowed the state to detain suspects for up to 90 days without charging them.

He was caught at Rivonia on 11 July, along with Govan Mbeki, Ahmed Kathrada and 14 others. At the conclusion of the Rivonia Trial, Sisulu was sentenced to life imprisonment on 12 June 1964. Part of his testimony during the trial included the commitment:

I wish to make this solemn vow in full appreciation of the consequences it entails. As long as I enjoy the confidence of my people, and as long as there is a spark of life and energy in me, I shall fight with courage and determination for the abolition of discriminatory laws and for the freedom of all South Africans irrespective of colour or creed.

=== 1964–1989: Imprisonment ===
With other senior ANC figures, Sisulu served the majority of his sentence on Robben Island, though he was later transferred to Pollsmoor Prison. His wife, Albertina Sisulu, was frequently under banning orders – the first from 1964 to 1969 – which prevented her from travelling to Cape Town to visit him.

=== 1989–1994: End of apartheid ===
As part of the prelude to the negotiations to end apartheid, Sisulu and other Rivonia Trial defendants were released from prison on 15 October 1989; Sisulu was 77. His return to Soweto was greeted with celebrations in the street, and he told media of his long detention, "It was not possible to despair because the spirit of the people outside was too great". In 1990, he formed part of the ANC delegation to the negotiations with the government which resulted in the Groote Schuur Minute. In July 1991, at the ANC's first national conference since its unbanning the year before, Sisulu was elected ANC Deputy President. It was believed that he had been convinced to accept the job in order to prevent a disruptive power struggle between a younger generation of activists – such as Cyril Ramaphosa, Thabo Mbeki, and Chris Hani – vying for the deputy presidency. After 1994, Walter Sisulu chose not to take a formal position in Mandela’s government, preferring to stay behind the scenes. He believed his role was to support, not seek personal power.

== Retirement and death ==
In 1994, the ANC won a majority in South Africa's first democratic elections and formed a government headed by Mandela, but Sisulu, weakened by age and his long imprisonment, declined to serve in public office. At the ANC's 49th National Conference in December that year, he also declined to run for re-election to the party's leadership. After his retirement, he and his family continued to live in Soweto, where they had lived before the Rivonia Trial. Walter Sisulu died on May 5, 2003—exactly 29 years after the death of ANC founder Dr. Alfred Xuma, a man who had once mentored him. This poetic historical overlap added symbolic weight to his legacy.

Sisulu died at his home in Linden, Johannesburg on the evening of 5 May 2003, just shy of his 91st birthday, in the presence of his wife. He was given a "special official funeral" on 17 May 2003. Among the tributes he received after his death, Mandela – joking that both he and Sisulu "had long passed the age when either of us would protest against the brevity of life" – said:

Our paths first intersected in 1941. During the past 62 years our lives have been intertwined. We shared the joy of living, and the pain. Together we shared ideas, forged common commitments. We walked side by side through the valley of death, nursing each other's bruises, holding each other up when our steps faltered. Together we savoured the taste of freedom. From the moment when we first met he has been my friend, my brother, my keeper, my comrade.

After Mandela's death in 2013, Mac Maharaj – who had been on Robben Island with both men and later became a cabinet minister – told the media that he had had Sisulu and Mandela write obituaries for each other before 2003, and had kept both.

== Personality and public image ==
His admirers, including Mandela, frequently noted his humility. Those imprisoned with him on Robben Island remarked upon his unflappable calm and patience – as Mandela put it in his autobiography, "He was often silent when others were shouting." After his release from prison, according to the Los Angeles Times, Sisulu "was always a voice for moderation, preaching the importance of a national reconciliation". Upon his death, Kathrada told the New York Times:

I've always said that one can't speak of Mandela without speaking of Sisulu. They complement each other... Mandela was highly respected, highly admired. But I would not be able to say he was as loved as Sisulu was. You know that difference between a father and a leader? That was the big difference between them.

== Personal life ==
In 1944, Sisulu married Albertina, a nurse, whom he had met in 1942 in Johannesburg; Mandela was his best man at their wedding. At the ceremony, Lembede warned Albertina: "You are marrying a man who is already married to the nation." Sisulu later recalled, "Even when I married my wife, I told her it was useless buying new furniture. I was going to be in jail." While he was in prison, Albertina became a very important anti-apartheid activist in her own right, with leadership roles in the United Democratic Front and Federation of South African Women. In 1982, Ruth First paid tribute to their marriage at an ANC celebration for Walter (in absentia) on his birthday, saying: "His capacity to lead and her political strength are... the product of a good marriage, a good political marriage, but a good marriage, one that is based on genuine equality and on shared commitment." Both were born into Christian families, but, asked in 1992 whether they practised their religion, Albertina replied: "There’s no time, my dear."

Together, the couple had five children: Max (born 1945), an ANC politician; Mlungisi, a businessman (born 1948, died 2015); Zwelakhe, a journalist (born 1950, died 2012); Lindiwe (born 1954), also an ANC politician; and Nonkululeko (born 1958). They also adopted three children: two – Beryl, a diplomat, and Gerald Lockman – are biologically the children of Walter's deceased sister; while the third, Jongumzi, is the son of Sisulu's cousin. Jongi served a five-year sentence on Robben Island for his anti-apartheid activism in the 1980s, and other family members were also periodically detained.

In 2002, Max's wife, Elinor, published a biography of her parents-in-law, entitled Walter and Albertina Sisulu: In Our Lifetime.

== Awards and legacy ==
In 1992, Sisulu was awarded Isitwalandwe Medal, the highest honour granted by the ANC, for his contribution to the liberation struggle in South Africa. The government of India awarded him the Padma Vibhushan in 1998.

In 2004, Sisulu was ranked 33rd on SABC 3's list of Great South Africans. The Walter Sisulu National Botanic Garden, Walter Sisulu University and Walter Sisulu Local Municipality are named after him.

== See also ==
- List of people subject to banning orders under apartheid
- History of the African National Congress
