= Mbeki =

Mbeki is a surname of South African and Xhosa origin. Notable people with the surname include:

== Mbeki family ==
- Govan Mbeki, the father of Thabo Mbeki, politician, military commander, Communist leader
- Skelewu Mbeki, chief of the Mpukane village in the Nqamakwe district and the father of Govan Mbeki.
- Epainette Mbeki, the mother of Thabo Mbeki, known as "MaMbeki", a stalwart community activist and promoter of women's development
  - Linda Mbeki, first born and only daughter of Govan and only sister of Thabo, and South African political activist
  - Thabo Mbeki, former President of South Africa
  - Zanele Mbeki (née Dlamini), wife of Thabo Mbeki, a feminist South African social worker who founded the Women's Development Bank
    - Monwabisi Kwanda Mbeki, son of Thabo Mbeki
  - Moeletsi Mbeki, son of Govan and brother of Thabo, deputy chairman of the South African Institute of International Affairs
  - Jama Mbeki, last born of Govan and youngest brother of Thabo, and law student
