= Linda Mbeki Hospice =

The Linda Mbeki Hospice is a hospice in Mbewuleni, Eastern Cape (Chris Hani District Municipality), South Africa. Operating from the former home of former President of South Africa Thabo Mbeki, the facility was named after Linda Mbeki, the daughter of Govan and Epainette Mbeki following her death in 2003. It famously had a staff of three, together with 35 care workers, before it had any beds.
