= Nomaka Mbeki Technical Senior Secondary School =

School in South Africa established by Epainette Mbeki

Coordinates: 32.1450°S 28.3391°E

The Nomaka Mbeki Technical Senior Secondary School, established by Epainette Mbeki, is a secondary institution in Ngcingwane, a rural hamlet near Dutywa, one of South Africa's poorest municipalities. It caters for Grades Ten to Twelve, and has been recognised as one of the region's four S4 (the highest category) schools. Its netball team is ranked second in the Eastern Cape province, while its debating team has earned national honours. It is one of four Mandela schools, promoting the socio-economic needs of its community.

Mbeki, widow of Govan and mother of Thabo, has endeavoured to secure a library, laboratories and more reading material for the school. "If I die before this is achieved," she says, "I'm going to be a spook; I'm going to come back and persecute everybody until my ideal is reached." Bob Mngxitama, the headmaster, agrees: "MaMbeki will go to Bhisho as a ghost." in this school there's a lack of equipment for students. Also some live far from the school and those learners travel by foot for long distance to school.
