= Jama Mbeki =

Younger son of Govan Mbeki (1948-1982)

- Born: 1948; Mbewuleni, Transkei, South Africa
- Died: 1982 disappeared: Lesotho (presumed); Angola (disputed); Botswana (presumed)
- Occupation: Law student
- Parents: Govan Mbeki (father); Epainette Mbeki (mother)
- Relatives: Linda Mbeki (sister); Thabo Mbeki (brother); Moeletsi Mbeki (brother); Monwabisi Kwanda Mbeki (nephew); Skelewu Mbeki (grandfather)

Jama Mbeki (born 1948 - disappeared 1982) was a political activist, law student and the last born son of Govan Mbeki, a renowned South African anti-apartheid revolutionary, and his wife Epainette Mbeki. Mbeki disappeared during the anti-apartheid struggle in exile in 1982 and was never found to date.

== Early life and education ==
He is noted for his family’s prominence in the African National Congress (ANC) and the South African Communist Party (SACP) and his political activism later on in exile. He pursued legal studies at Roma University in Lesotho before completing a Bachelor of Laws at the University of Leeds in the United Kingdom. After his studies, he settled in Botswana, where he married and had three children.

== Political activism and disappearance ==
In 1982, Mbeki and his wife and their three daughters were residing in exile in Botswana. On the eve of his scheduled court appearance -having been arrested on charges of fraud and accessory to murder, Mbeki vanished without a trace.

Mbeki's early life was shaped in Lesotho, where, from the age of ten, he was raised by the Moerane family, who were stalwarts of the Africanist Basutoland Congress Party (BCP). The BCP, an offshoot of the African National Congress (ANC) with closer ideological ties to the Pan Africanist Congress of Azania (PAC), provided Jama with his first political affiliations. As a student leader, he went underground in 1974 when the BCP was forced into exile, and later helped establish the insurgent Lesotho Liberation Army (LLA).

At twenty-three, Mbeki joined the community of BCP exiles in Botswana. During this period, Thabo Mbeki - his elder brother also in exile - secured a scholarship for him to study at the University of Leeds. Despite the Lesotho Liberation Army accepting covert support from the apartheid regime in South Africa and the ANC’s alliance with the Basutoland National Party (BNP), the Mbeki brothers developed a personal bond. After settling permanently in Botswana with his family, Mbeki’s disappearance remained a mystery for years. In the early 1990s, the prominent Mbeki family retained legal counsel to investigate their son's disappearance. The inquiry uncovered that Mbeki had been lured into a trap and executed.

This is after Mbeki travelled to Lesotho to visit a former university friend who had allegedly cooperated with Apartheid security forces and captured upon arrival. His body was never recovered, and his burial site remains unknown.

During hearings of the Truth and Reconciliation Commission in 1998, former ANC Angola commissar General Andrew Masondo confirmed Jama Mbeki’s disappearance in Botswana. Masondo testified that, despite inquiries from the post-apartheid government, no definitive information about Mbeki’s fate or burial location was ever uncovered. Also the child of Thabo Mbeki, Mbeki's elder brother, also disappeared in exile in 1981 without trace. His name was Monwabisi Kwanda Mbeki.

== See also ==
- Skelewu Mbeki
- Monwabisi Kwanda Mbeki
