= Linda Mbeki =

South African activist (1941–2003)

- Born: 1941; Mbewuleni, Eastern Cape, Union of South Africa
- Died: 17 March 2003 (aged 61–62); South Africa
- Resting place: Idutywa, Eastern Cape, South Africa
- Known for: Political activism
- Children: 3
- Parents: Govan Mbeki (father); Epainette Mbeki (mother)
- Relatives: Jama Mbeki (brother); Moeletsi Mbeki (brother); Thabo Mbeki (brother)

Linda Thokozile Mbeki (1941 – 17 March 2003) was a South African political activist and a member of the prominent Mbeki family. She was the eldest daughter of the anti-apartheid stalwarts Govan Mbeki and Epainette Mbeki. She was also the elder sister of former South African president Thabo Mbeki

== Early life and career ==
Linda Mbeki was born in 1941 in the rural village of Mbewuleni in the Eastern Cape. She was the firstborn in a family deeply rooted in political resistance. Her father, Govan, was a leading figure in the African National Congress (ANC) and the South African Communist Party, and was imprisoned on Robben Island following the Rivonia Trial. Her mother, Epainette, was a pioneering community activist and one of South Africa’s first black female social workers.

In 1974, Mbeki was employed by Standard Bank, becoming the first black woman to work for the bank. Experiencing racism inside her workplace, she left the bank shortly.

In 1976, the apartheid police arrested and detained her without trial for 10 months in Pretoria and Thornhill, accused of plotting to overthrow the government.

Although less public than her more prominent family members, she was involved in community development and quietly supported the anti-apartheid movement. She worked closely with various grassroots organizations and was known for her commitment to social justice and gender equality.

== Death ==
Mbeki died in 2003. Her funeral was attended by prominent political leaders and activists such as Mosiuoa Lekota, Manto Tshabalala-Msimang, Mluleki George, Raymond Mhlaba and was praised for her humility, dedication to the struggle and her role in supporting her family through difficult political times. Her younger brother Moeletsi Mbeki told the mourners that his sister was generous.

== See also ==
- Linda Mbeki Hospice
- Jama Mbeki
