= Inkundla Ya Bantu =

Former South African newspaper

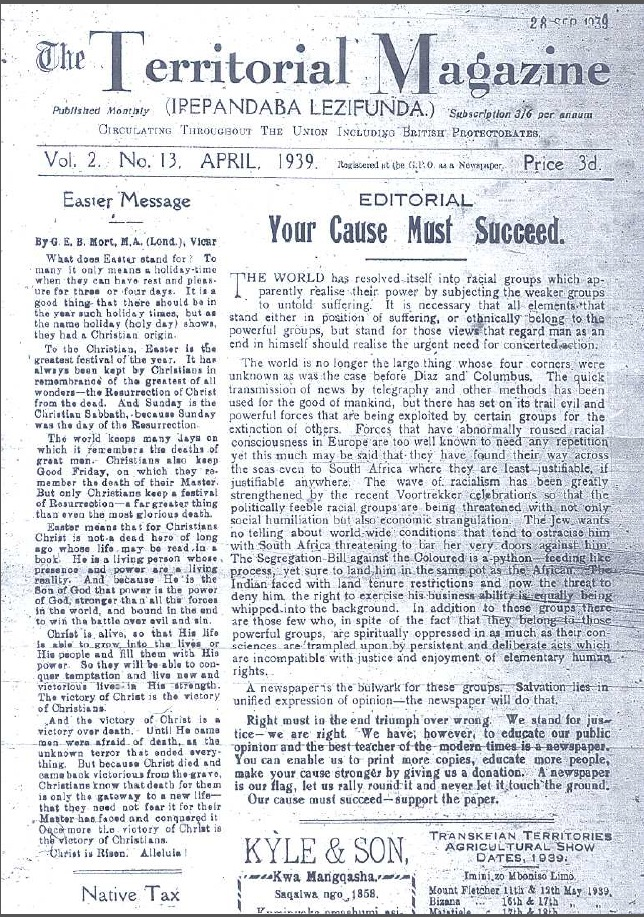
- First edition of Inkundla Ya Bantu
- Publisher: Verulam Publishers
- Editor: Phillip Katamzi, Govan Mbeki, Jordan Ngubane
- Language: English, IsiZulu, IsiXhosa
- Country: South Africa

Inkundla Ya Bantu is a defunct South African newspaper. It was active from the late 1930s until the early 1950s.

== History ==
Inkundla Ya Bantu was first published in April 1938 under the name Territorial Magazine. It was renamed in June 1940. Its distribution area covered at first the rural parts of the Eastern Cape and Southern Parts of KwaZulu-Natal and then expanded to the Johannesburg and Witwatersrand area. The newspaper was a monthly at first and in 1943 became a fortnightly publication and then a weekly. In its last two years it returned to sporadic monthly issues.

Inkundla Ya Bantu was the only independent, 100% black-owned newspaper at the time. It played a significant role in African politics. Inlkundla ya Bantu was the only newspaper of its kind that enjoyed national coverage. Because of this, Inkundla Ya Bantu was uniquely free to publish material, including political material, without fear. Inkundla Ya Bantu was sympathetic to the oppressed Africans and was concerned with highlighting their plight. Inkundla reported articles on both communist and anti-communist trade unions and was a passionate supporter of the marginalised.

"Inkundla sought to represent the subjugated African population in ordering a protest agenda that would unify the resistance movement, and it was a medium used by the Youth League to challenge the cautious and accommodationist ANC leadership"

=== Editors ===
Inkundla Ya Bantu's first editor was Phillip Goduka Katamzi. Katamzi was succeeded by Govan Mbeki after a year. Mbeki remained editor until he resigned in 1943. Jordan Kush Ngubane followed, remaining until the end.

==== Controversy ====
Accounts differ over who held the title of editor during 1939 and 1943. It is generally agreed upon by most scholars that Philip Katamzi was the first editor and that he held this position for about a year. Thereafter he handed over his duties to Govan Mbeki, and Mbeki edited the newspaper until 1943 when he resigned. However, the other version states that Govan Mbeki was never the editor and that Phillip Katamzi was the editor for five years. The first version is more popular, but Jordan Ngubane himself supported the second version. Mbeki and his wife Epainette Mbeki, made regular contributions to Inkundla Ya Bantu during the time that he was believed to have been the editor.

=== African National Congress Youth League ===
Inkundla Ya Bantu openly supported African National Congress Youth League (ANCYL) and published many of its members' articles, most notably Anton Lembede, who was ANCYL president. Lembede was the mastermind behind ANCYL's political philosophy at the time, especially relating to African Nationalism. The ANC had no official press of its own. The newspaper often acted as the mouthpiece of the party and its youth league. The newspaper's editor's were prominent ANC figures. For instance Mbeki was an ANC leader and became the Secretary of High Command of the ANC's armed wing, Umkhonto we Sizwe. Ngubane was one of the founding members of ANCYL. Mbeki was a firm communist and Ngubane a "virulent anticommunist". According to Ntongela Masilela "Jordan Ngubane [in his capacity] as editor of Inkundla ya Bantu (People's Forum) in the 1940s articulat[ed] African nationalism as the 'natural ideology of the ANC' rather than Marxism"
