= Castro Hlongwane, Caravans, Cats, Geese, Foot & Mouth and Statistics =

Castro Hlongwane, Caravans, Cats, Geese, Foot & Mouth and Statistics: HIV/Aids and the Struggle for the Humanisation of the African is an anonymously-authored 2002 document that was distributed to party members during the 51st National Conference of the African National Congress. The 114-page document alleges that presidential spokesperson Parks Mankahlana and AIDS/HIV icon Nkosi Johnson had died because of consumption of antiretrovirals. It was alleged that Peter Mokaba, a noted pro-AIDS reappraisal politician, had co-authored the document, even though it was written in a manner that was typical of a high-ranking leader within the party. In 2007, Mark Gevisser's biography on Thabo Mbeki mentioned the author's secret contact with the president during the writing of the biography. Mbeki did not directly claim authorship of the document, but said it reflected his views. He also sent Gevisser a revised version of the document, which was double the length and featured additional quoted material. The Word document's properties also traced it to Mbeki's computer.

The paper was derided by ANC member Dr. Saadiq Kariem as "ludicrous", and international criticism of the stance eventually forced Mbeki to back off from his public stance on AIDS reappraisal. However, the ANC never repudiated the document.
