= Gerrit Olivier =

Professor Gerrit Olivier is a South African academic and diplomat. In 1991 he became the first diplomatic representative of South Africa to the Soviet Union and in 1992 he was appointed as the first South African Ambassador to the Russian Federation and Kazakhstan. He died on 12 September 2026.

== Life ==
Olivier gained his doctorate from the University of Pretoria in the discipline of international politics. He subsequently became senior lecturer in political science at the University of Zululand before being appointed to the chair of International Politics at Pretoria.

In 1983 he left academia to enter the diplomatic service and in 1991 became South Africa's first diplomat on mission to the Soviet Union and was first Ambassador to the Russian Federation, also representing South Africa in Kazakhstan. In 1996 Olivier returned to his academic career and was appointed as director of the Centre for European Studies at what was then the Rand Afrikaans University. He was a founding member, and later president, for 8 years, of the South African Political Science Association, and first editor of Politikon – a journal in political science. He remains an active member of the committees of several institutions, including the Pretoria Branch of the South African Institute of International Affairs, the South African Business Chamber, the Broadcasting Complaints Commission of South Africa and commissioner on the Afrikaanse Taalmuseum Council]. He is Professor Extraordinaire in the Department of Political Sciences at the University of Pretoria. He remains involved in the study of Russian foreign and security policy and SA/Africa/Russian relations and is the founder and Chairman of the South African/Russian Dialogue Forum (SARDF)He wrote various books, chapters in books and articles on international relations., as weLl as op-ed articles for South African Newspapers, also commenting on radio and television on current events.

In 2013 Prof Oliver was awarded the Stals Award for political science from the "Suid-Afrikaanse Akademie vir Wetenskap en Kuns".
