= Monwabisi Kwanda Mbeki =

South African President's son

Monwabisi Kwanda Mbeki (1959 — missing since 1981) is the son of former South African President Thabo Mbeki. His disappearance and presumed murder at the hands of apartheid authorities has been a matter of international interest.

== Biography ==
Monwabisi Kwanda Mbeki known as Kwanda was born to then 16-year-old Thabo Mbeki and high school sweetheart Olive Mphahlwa in 1959, in Butterworth, Eastern Cape. Under Xhosa law, Thabo had to pay a penalty for making an under-age girl pregnant. He gave five head of cattle.

Mbeki lived with Olive's family until the age of ten, when he moved in with Thabo's mother, Epainette Mbeki (known as Ma Mofokeng), until he passed matric.

== Disappearance ==
In 1976, Mbeki went into exile with one of Thabo's old comrades Phindile Mfeti. Mbeki had heard from Mfeti that his father was in exile in Swaziland and decided to join him. Mbeki's voice was heard for the last time over a phone when he told Thabo's friend that he was in Durban. He disappeared in 1981. Mbeki's disappearance in exile in 1981 was followed by his paternal uncle's disappearance in 1982 in exile also, his name was Jama Mbeki.

== Truth and Reconciliation Commission ==
In 1998, both Thabo and Olive spoke at the TRC and found that the last place Mbeki was seen alive was at the ANC military base in Tanzania. It was assumed that both Mbeki and Mfeti were killed by the Apartheid government's forces.

In 2006, it was announced that a new enquiry was to be launched to try to find out what happened. It was noted that hundreds of bodies of ANC members killed by the authorities of the time have never been located.
