= Moeletsi Mbeki =

South African political economist

Moeletsi Goduka Mbeki
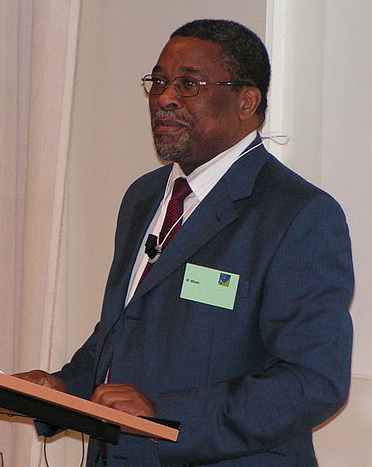
- Mbeki in Leiden, 2007
- Born: Moeletsi Goduka Mbeki; 9 November 1945 (age 80); Mbewuleni, Idutywa, Transkei (now Eastern Cape).
- Occupations: Political and economic commentator
- Known for: Deputy chairman South African Institute of International Affairs
- Parents: Govan Mbeki (father); Epainette Mbeki (mother)
- Relatives: Linda Mbeki (sister; born 1941, died 2003); Thabo Mbeki (brother; born 1942); Jama Mbeki (brother; born 1948, died 1982); Skelewu Mbeki (grandfather; born 1828-died 1918)

Moeletsi Goduka Mbeki (born 30 November 1945) is a South African political economist and the chairman of the South African Institute of International Affairs, an independent think tank based at the University of the Witwatersrand, and a political analyst for Nedcor Bank. He is a member of the executive council of the International Institute for Strategic Studies (IISS) which is based in London. He is the younger brother of former President Thabo Mbeki and son of ANC leader Govan Mbeki. He has been a frequent critic of President Mbeki.

== Career ==
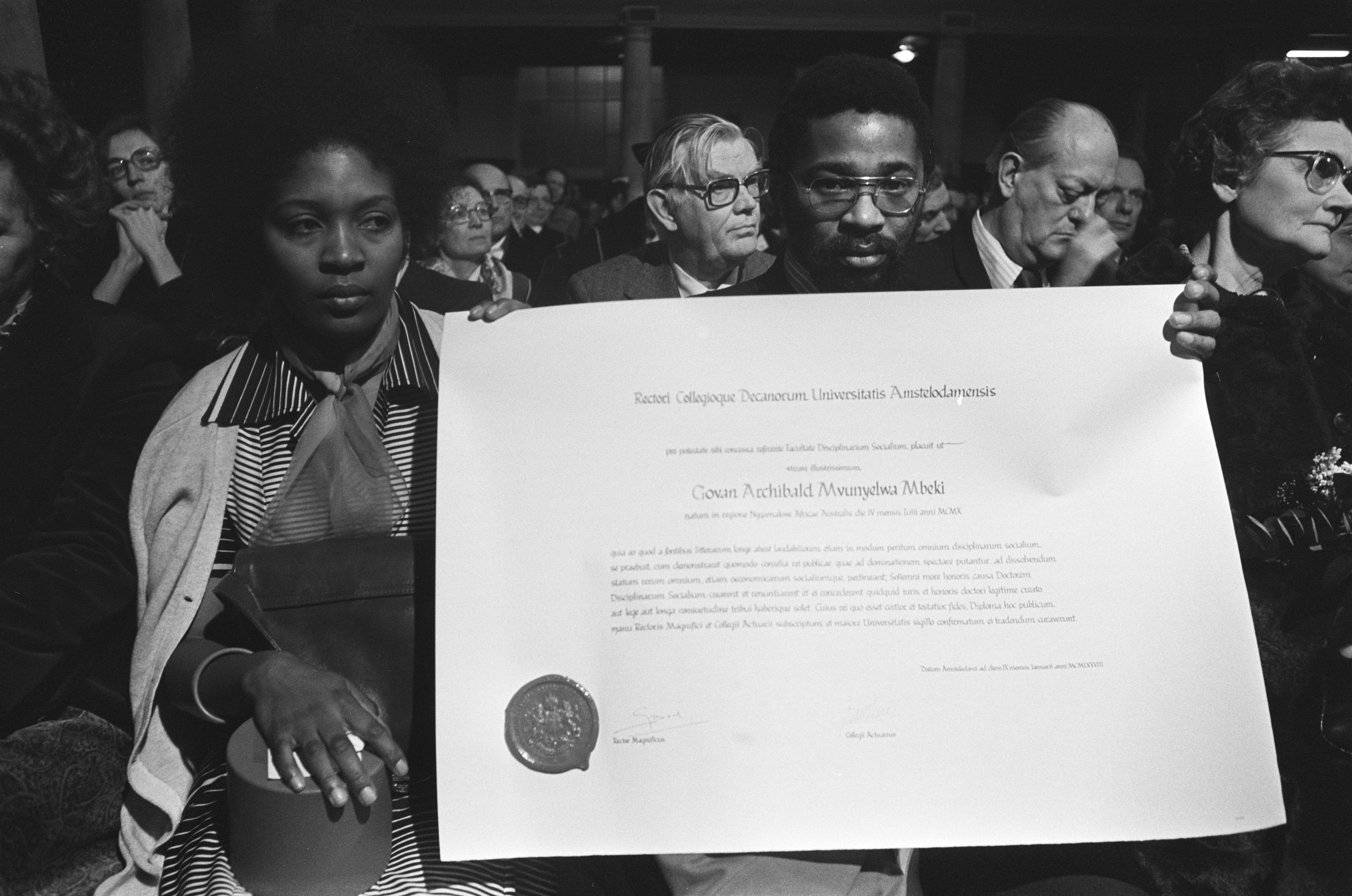
Moeletsi Mbeki receives Govan Mbeki's honorary doctorate (Amsterdam, 1978)

Moeletsi Goduka Mbeki has a background in journalism, with a resume that includes a Harvard University Nieman Fellowship and time at the BBC. He worked for The Herald newspaper as a journalist while in exile in Zimbabwe. He often acts as a political commentator in South Africa, and is the author of a paper titled "Perpetuating Poverty in Sub-Saharan Africa", published on 30 June 2005 by the International Policy Network. He was a media consultant for the ANC in the 1990s, and is currently the chairman of Endemol South Africa, a TV production house, and KMM Review Publishing and Africa. He has also been director of Comazar, which rehabilitates and grants concessions to railway networks in Africa.

In 2003 it was revealed by John Perlman that the SABC had blacklisted a lot of political commentators and that Moeletsi was one of them, possibly due to his political views. Moeletsi generated some controversy when he said that Africa was governed better under colonial rule than today. (See October 2007 in rail transport). In October 2006 Moeletsi Mbeki applied for an order to have Jonathan Moyo jailed the next time he visits South Africa. He has been known to oppose certain Black Economic Empowerment (BEE) deals in South Africa and has written articles for the Cato Institute, a USA-based libertarian think tank.

With his book Architects of Poverty: Why African Capitalism Needs Changing in 2009 he triggered a debate about governance, ethics and moral values in African governance processes.

== Controversies ==
Although more recently known as a critic of black economic empowerment (BEE) policies and corruption, one of the main sources of Moeletsi Mbeki's wealth was a BEE deal linked to South Africa's controversial Arms Deal. Mbeki reportedly shared a 25% BEE stake in the South African subsidiary of British armoured vehicle company Vickers Defence Systems. Chippy Shaik, whose brother Schabir Shaik was separately convicted for corruption linked to the Arms Deal, was reportedly pivotal in influencing procurement to favour Vickers Defence Systems and therefore Mbeki. Chippy Shaik was accused of accepting a bribe but never prosecuted. Vickers was later taken over by BAE Systems, likely leading to a large windfall for Mbeki and his partner Diliza Mji. Mji was a former treasurer of the ANC in KwaZulu-Natal and the defence parastatal Armscor.

Moeletsi Mbeki was sued by employees when a think-tank he founded, the Forum for Public Dialogue, ran out of money and retrenched the employees.

== Other activities ==
- International Institute for Strategic Studies (IISS), Member of the Advisory Council

== Writings ==
- Moeletsi Mbeki: Architects of Poverty. Why African Capitalism Needs Changing, Central Books, April 2009, ISBN 1770101616
- Moeletsi Mbeki: Advocates for change. How to overcome Africa's challenges, Picador Africa, 2011, ISBN 978-1-77010-120-3

He has written many articles about the political and economic situation in South Africa, Zimbabwe and the rest of Africa.
