= Skelewu Mbeki =

Father of Govan Mbeki (1828–1918)

- Born: 1828; Bergville, Zulu Kingdom
- Died: 1918 (aged 89–90); Mpukane, Cape Colony
- Spouse: Johanna Mabula
- Children: Eight children, including Sipho and Govan
- Father: Mbeki Nonkasa
- Relatives: Thabo Mbeki (grandson); Moeletsi Mbeki (grandson)

Skelewu Mbeki (1828 – 1918) was the chief of the Mpukane village in the Nqamakwe district from the late 1860s until 1911. He was the father of Govan Mbeki.

Skelewu Mbeki was born in 1828 in Bergville, KwaZulu-Natal, to the AmaFengu people, a Nguni clan displaced during the Mfecane. His paternal grandfather, Nonkasa, fled the Mfecane from Bergville in the 1830s, seeking refuge under Xhosa King Hintsa kaKhawuta and settling in Peddie. The family later moved to Healdtown, where Mbeki attended a Methodist missionary school, becoming fluent in both English and Xhosa. This education helped Mbeki become a key colonial agent, translating regulations for the Xhosa-speaking communities.

In the late 1860s, Mbeki relocated to Mpukane in the Nqamakwe district, where he became the head of the village due to his respected leadership. In 1890, the British colonial administration formally recognized him as the chief of Mpukane. He owned significant land, including the "Mbeki farm" in Nyili, and a wagon and team of oxen that people hired to transport livestock to the market. In 1893, Mbeki married Johanna Mabula, a prominent local woman who was also fluent in English, Xhosa and Dutch. Together, they had five children, including Sipho and Govan Mbeki. All of Mbeki's eight children received secondary education at Healdtown, and six of them, including Govan, became teachers.

In 1911, at the age of 83, Mbeki was charged with illegally selling oxen across the Kei River, violating colonial laws aimed at preventing animal diseases. He admitted to the crime, citing financial pressures. He was fined £10 and removed as chief. And while the people of Mpukane wanted another Mbeki as chief, especially his elder son Sipho, but this was declined by the colonial administration. Skelewu Mbeki died in 1918 at the age of 90.
