= South African Institute of International Affairs =

South African think tank

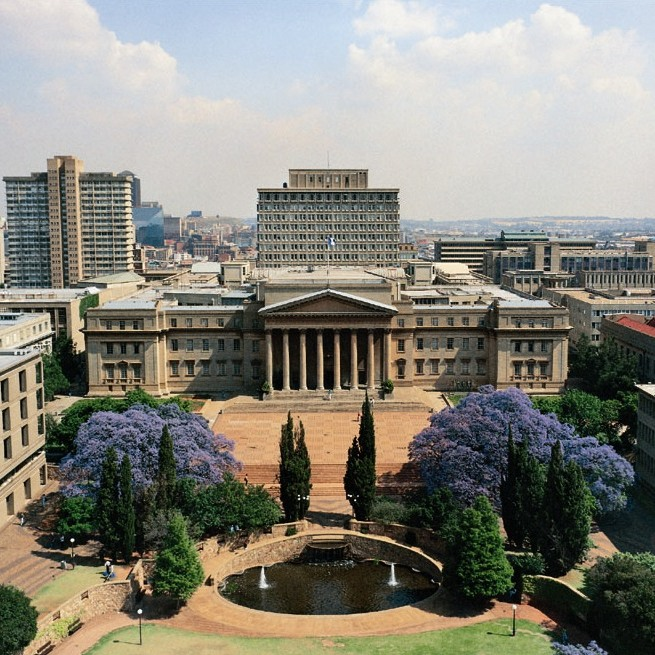
- The University of the Witwatersrand
- Established: 1934; 92 years ago
- Purpose: African foreign policy analysis, risk analysis, governance and conflict analysis, economic analysis
- Headquarters: Jan Smuts House, Wits University, Johannesburg, South Africa
- Chairman: Moeletsi Mbeki
- Chief Executive: Elizabeth Sidiropoulos
- Website: saiia.org.za

The South African Institute of International Affairs (SAIIA) is an independent public policy and foreign relations think tank based in Johannesburg, South Africa. Founded in 1934 in Cape Town, the institute has been located on the campus of the University of the Witwatersrand since 1944.

The institute is organised under four research programmes in the fields of 'Foreign Policy', 'African Governance and Diplomacy', 'Economic Resilience and Inclusion', and 'Climate and Natural Resources'. Since 1993, SAIIA has published the quarterly, peer-reviewed South African Journal of Foreign Affairs through Routledge of Taylor & Francis, along with monographs, policy papers and opinion pieces.

SAIIA was ranked third among African think tanks in the 2020 Global Go To Think Tank Index Report published by the University of Pennsylvania. It is ranked 85th internationally and is one of only five African think tanks placed in the global Top 100. The institute maintains a 'strategic partnership' with Chatham House, engaging particularly in the field African-European relations.

The current chair of SAIIA is Moeletsi Mbeki, with Elizabeth Sidiropoulos as Chief Executive.

== History ==
SAIIA was founded in 1934 in Cape Town with Sir James Carruthers Beattie, the first president of the University of Cape Town, and F. S. Malan, formerly President of the Senate of South Africa, as president and vice-president, respectively.

After World War II, then Chairperson Dr WJ Busschau moved the head office of SAIIA to the new Jan Smuts House in Johannesburg, which was established by the Smuts Memorial Trust along with the establishment of the Department of International Relations at the University of the Witwatersrand.

Since 1969, SAIIA has organised annual conferences and created partnerships with global research institutions and academic departments. Between 1934 and 1983, the institute opened branch offices in all major South African cities, as well as Namibia and the United Kingdom.

Shortly before the end of Apartheid and South Africa's political transition in 1994, SAIIA began publishing the South African Journal of International Affairs. Between 1996 and 2005, the institute was led by Greg Mills as national director and began working closely with diplomatic missions in South Africa as strategic partners.

In November 2024, SAIIA was chosen by South Africa's foreign ministry, the Department of International Relations and Cooperation (DIRCO), as one of three think tanks to coordinate the research component of South Africa's 2025 G20 presidency.

== Research Programmes ==
SAIIA is organised in five research programmes:

- African Governance and Diplomacy
- Climate and Natural Resources
- Economic Diplomacy
- Foreign Policy
- SAIIA Futures

Further, research is categorised according to themes, which include Climate Change, Development, Economic Diplomacy, Foresight, Foreign Policy, Governance, and Natural Resources.

== Funding ==
As an independent institute, SAIIA is funded primarily through external donors, which include the Department of International Relations and Cooperation, Konrad Adenauer Foundation, the Swedish International Development Cooperation Agency, the United States Agency for International Development, Chatham House, Southern Africa Trust, Terre des Hommes, the European Union, the Embassy of Finland, Ekurhuleni Municipality, the Gauteng Provincial Government, and the Norwegian Foreign Ministry.
