= Nqamakwe =

- Location within Eastern Cape Location within South Africa Location within Africa
- Coordinates: 32.2°S 27.933333°E
- Country: South Africa
- Province: Eastern Cape
- District: Amathole
- Municipality: Mnquma

Area
  - Total: 1.47 km^{2} (0.57 sq mi)

Population (2011)
  - Total: 1,558
  - Density: 1,060/km^{2} (2,750/sq mi)

Racial makeup (2011)
  - Black African: 94.7%
  - Coloured: 1.9%
  - Indian/Asian: 0.6%
  - White: 1.5%
  - Other: 1.2%

First languages (2011)
  - Xhosa: 94.4%
  - English: 1.1%
  - Other: 4.6%
- Time zone: UTC+2 (SAST)
- PO box: 4990
- Area code: 047

Nqamakwe is a town in Amatole District Municipality in the Eastern Cape province of South Africa.

== History ==
In 1865, a number of Mfengu clans were resettled in the area around Nqamakwe. As refugees from the Mfacane wars further north, they had relatively few links to their former rural tribal economy and, at a relatively early stage, came under the guidance of European missionaries. Realising the need for an education in the colonial economy they were now attempting to enter, they began, on their own initiative, to collect funds and to lay down the groundwork for the establishment of a technical training institute.

The village of Nqamakwe was established in 1876 as the seat of the new Government Agent to the amaMfengu, and the College was opened in 1877 on a site located a short distance outside Nqamakwe. It was named Blythswood in honour of Capt MT Blyth, the Government Agent to Fingoland.

== Notable inhabitants ==
It is also birthplace of South African activists Govan Mbeki, Annie Silinga and Dora Tamana as well as the cardiologist and professor Bongani Mayosi.
