= Thabo Mbeki =

President of South Africa from 1999 to 2008

His Excellency Thabo Mbeki
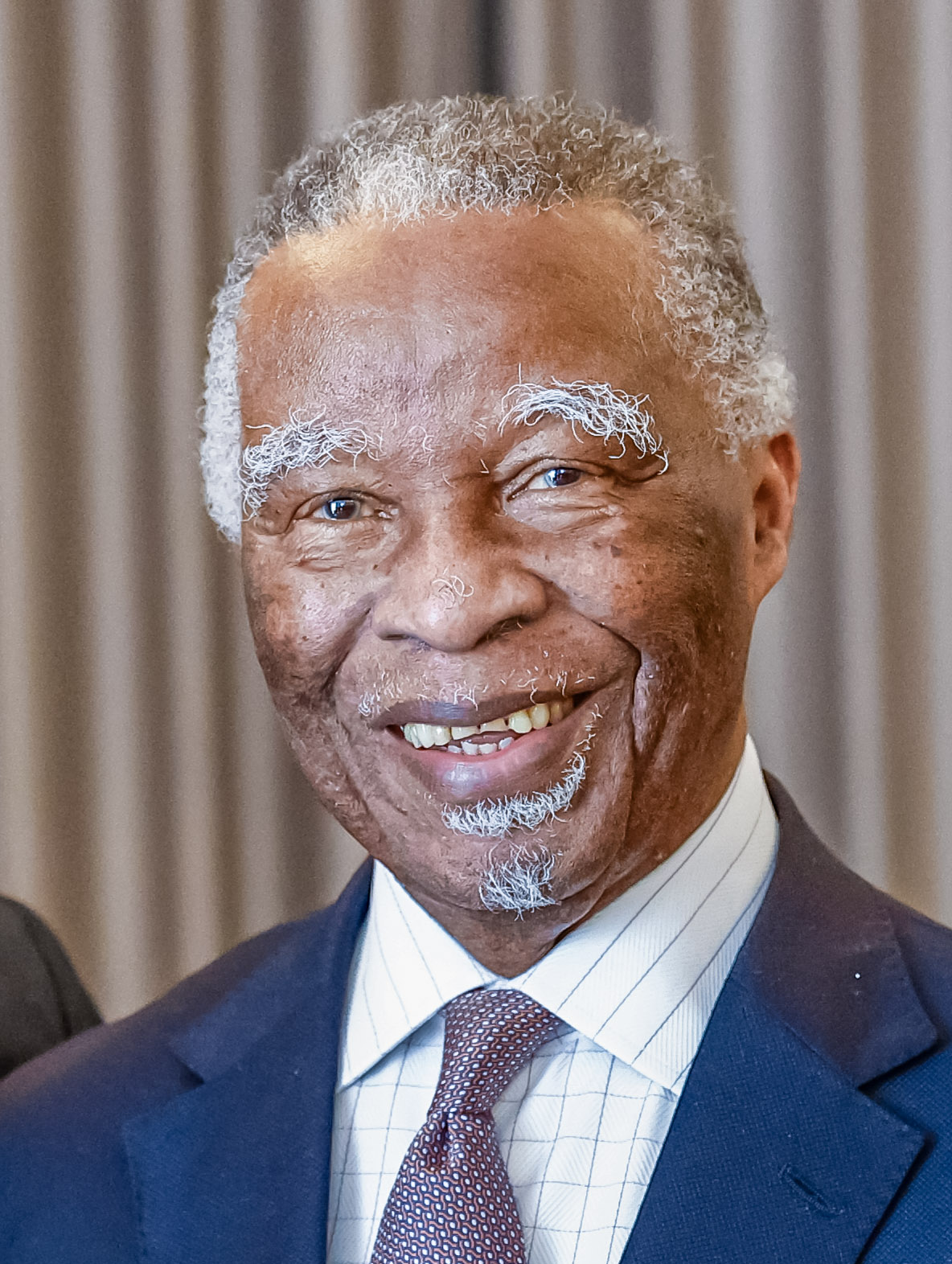
- Mbeki in 2023

2nd President of South Africa
- In office 14 June 1999 – 24 September 2008
- Deputy: Jacob Zuma (1999–2005); Phumzile Mlambo-Ngcuka (2005–2008)
- Preceded by: Nelson Mandela
- Succeeded by: Kgalema Motlanthe (Note: Ivy Matsepe-Casaburri briefly served as Acting President for 14 hours between 24 September 2008 – 25 September 2008.)

President of the African National Congress
- In office 20 December 1997 – 18 December 2007
- Deputy: Jacob Zuma
- Preceded by: Nelson Mandela
- Succeeded by: Jacob Zuma

Deputy President of South Africa
- In office 10 May 1994 – 14 June 1999 Serving with F. W. de Klerk until 30 June 1996
- President: Nelson Mandela
- Preceded by: Alwyn Schlebusch (as vice state president)
- Succeeded by: Jacob Zuma

Deputy President of the African National Congress
- In office 20 December 1994 – 20 December 1997
- President: Nelson Mandela
- Preceded by: Walter Sisulu
- Succeeded by: Jacob Zuma

Member of the National Assembly
- In office 9 May 1994 – 20 December 1997
- Constituency: Eastern Cape

National Chairperson of the African National Congress
- In office 24 April 1993 – 20 December 1994
- Preceded by: Oliver Tambo
- Succeeded by: Jacob Zuma
Additional offices 1999‍–‍present
Secretary-General of the Non-Aligned Movement
In office 14 June 1999 – 31 October 2003
Preceded by	Nelson Mandela
Succeeded by	Mahathir Mohamad
Chairperson of the African Union
In office 9 July 2002 – 10 July 2003
Preceded by	Office established
Succeeded by	Joaquim Chissano
Chancellor of the University of South Africa
Incumbent
Assumed office 8 December 2016
Vice Chancellor	Puleng LenkaBula
Preceded by	Bernard Ngoepe

Personal details
- Born: Thabo Mvuyelwa Mbeki; 18 June 1942 (age 84) Mbewuleni, South Africa
- Party: African National Congress
- Other political affiliations: South African Communist Party (Tripartite Alliance)
- Spouse: Zanele Dlamini (m. 1974)
- Children: Kwanda Mbeki (son)
- Parents: Govan Mbeki (father); Epainette Mbeki (mother)
- Relatives: Skelewu Mbeki (grandfather); Moeletsi Mbeki (brother)
- Education: University of Sussex
- Occupation: Politician; economist; activist

Thabo Mvuyelwa Mbeki (Note: Xhosa: [tʰaɓɔ ʼmbɛːki]) (born 18 June 1942) is a South African politician and economist who served as the second president of South Africa from 1999 until his resignation in 2008. He previously served as deputy president under Nelson Mandela from 1994 to 1999.

The son of Govan Mbeki, an African National Congress (ANC) intellectual, Mbeki has been involved in ANC politics since 1956, when he joined the ANC Youth League, and has been a member of the party's National Executive Committee since 1975. Born in the Transkei, he left South Africa aged twenty to attend university in England, and spent almost three decades in exile abroad, until the ANC was unbanned in 1990. He rose through the organisation in its information and publicity section and as Oliver Tambo's protégé, but he was also an experienced diplomat, serving as the ANC's official representative in several of its African outposts. He was an early advocate for and leader of the diplomatic engagements which led to the negotiations to end apartheid. After South Africa's first democratic elections in 1994, he was appointed national deputy president. In subsequent years, it became apparent that he was Mandela's chosen successor, and he was elected unopposed as ANC president in 1997, enabling his rise to the presidency as the ANC's candidate in the 1999 elections.

While deputy president, Mbeki had been regarded as a steward of the government's Growth, Employment and Redistribution policy, introduced in 1996, and as president he continued to subscribe to relatively conservative, market-friendly macroeconomic policies. During his presidency, South Africa experienced falling public debt, a narrowing budget deficit, and consistent, moderate economic growth. However, despite his retention of various social democratic programmes, and notable expansions to the black economic empowerment programme, critics often regarded Mbeki's economic policies as neoliberal, with insufficient consideration for developmental and redistributive objectives. On these grounds, Mbeki grew increasingly alienated from the left wing of the ANC, and from the leaders of the ANC's Tripartite Alliance partners, the Congress of South African Trade Unions and South African Communist Party. It was these leftist elements which supported Jacob Zuma over Mbeki in the political rivalry that erupted after Mbeki removed the latter from his post as deputy president in 2005.

As president, Mbeki had an apparent predilection for foreign policy and particularly for multilateralism. His pan-Africanism and vision for an "African renaissance" are central parts of his political persona, and commentators suggest that he secured for South Africa a role in African and global politics that was disproportionate to the country's size and historical influence. He was the central architect of the New Partnership for Africa's Development and, as the inaugural chairperson of the African Union, spearheaded the introduction of the African Peer Review Mechanism. After the IBSA Dialogue Forum was launched in 2003, his government collaborated with India and Brazil to lobby for reforms at the United Nations, advocating for a stronger role for developing countries. Among South Africa's various peacekeeping commitments during his presidency, Mbeki was the primary mediator in the conflict between ZANU-PF and the Zimbabwean opposition in the 2000s. However, he was frequently criticised for his policy of "quiet diplomacy" in Zimbabwe, under which he refused to condemn Robert Mugabe's regime or institute sanctions against it.

Also highly controversial worldwide was Mbeki's HIV/AIDS policy. His government did not introduce a national mother-to-child transmission prevention programme until 2002, when it was mandated by the Constitutional Court, nor did it make antiretroviral therapy available in the public healthcare system until late 2003. Subsequent studies have estimated that these delays caused hundreds of thousands of preventable deaths. Mbeki himself, like his Health Minister Manto Tshabalala-Msimang, has been described as an AIDS denialist, "dissident", or sceptic. Although he did not explicitly deny the causal link between HIV and AIDS, he often posited a need to investigate alternate causes of and alternative treatments for AIDS, frequently suggesting that immunodeficiency was the indirect result of poverty.

His political descent began at the ANC's Polokwane conference in December 2007, when he was replaced as ANC president by Zuma. Although his term as national president was not due to expire until June 2009, he announced on 20 September 2008 that he would resign at the request of the ANC National Executive Committee. The ANC's decision to "recall" Mbeki was understood to be linked to a High Court judgement, handed down earlier that month, in which judge Chris Nicholson had alleged improper political interference in the National Prosecuting Authority and specifically in the corruption charges against Zuma. Nicholson's judgement was overturned by the Supreme Court of Appeal in January 2009, by which time Mbeki had been replaced as president by Kgalema Motlanthe.

== Early life and education ==
=== 1942–60: Eastern Cape ===
Mbeki was born on 18 June 1942 in Mbewuleni, a small village in the former homeland of Transkei, now part of the Eastern Cape. The second of four siblings, he had one sister, Linda (born 1941, died 2003), and two brothers, Moeletsi (born 1945) and Jama (born 1948, died 1982). His parents were Govan (born 1910, died 2001), a shopkeeper, teacher, journalist, and senior activist in the African National Congress (ANC) and the South African Communist Party (SACP), and Epainette (born 1916, died 2014), a trained teacher. Both Govan and Epainette came from educated, Christian, land-owning families, and Govan's father was Sikelewu Mbeki, a colonially appointed headman. The couple had met in Durban, where Epainette had become the second black woman to join the SACP (then still called the Communist Party of South Africa); however, while Mbeki was a child, his family was separated when Govan moved alone to Ladismith for a teaching job. Mbeki has said that he was "born into the struggle", and recalls that his childhood home was decorated with portraits of Karl Marx and Mahatma Gandhi. Govan named him after senior South African communist Thabo Mofutsanyana.

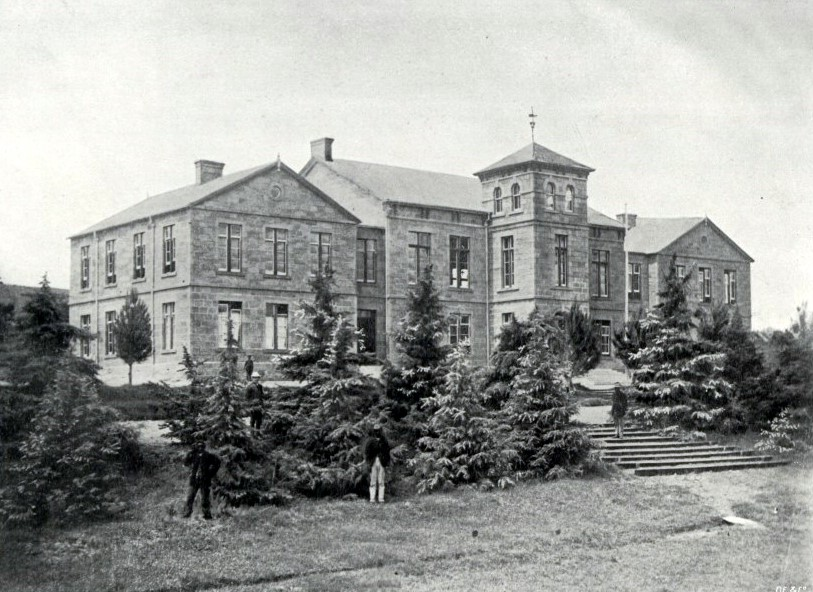
Lovedale, where Mbeki attended high school in the 1900s

Mbeki began attending school in 1948, the same year that the National Party was elected with a mandate to legislate apartheid. The Bantu Education Act was implemented towards the end of his school career, and in 1955 he arrived at the Lovedale Institute, an eminent mission school outside Alice, as part of the last class which would be permitted to follow the same curriculum as white students. At Lovedale, he was a year behind Chris Hani, his future colleague and rival in the ANC. Mbeki joined the ANC Youth League at age fourteen and in 1958 became the secretary of its Lovedale branch. Shortly afterwards, at the start of his final year of high school, he was identified as one of the leaders of a March 1959 boycott of classes, and was summarily expelled from Lovedale. He nonetheless sat for matric examinations and obtained a second-class pass.

=== 1960–62: Johannesburg ===
In June 1960, Mbeki moved to Johannesburg, where he lived in the home of ANC secretary general Duma Nokwe and where he intended to sit for A-level examinations. The ANC had recently been banned in the aftermath of the Sharpeville massacre, but Mbeki remained highly politically active, becoming national secretary of the African Students' Association, a new (and short-lived) youth movement envisaged as replacing the now illegal ANC Youth League. It was also during this period that Nokwe recruited Mbeki into the SACP.

Thus the ANC instructed him to join the growing cohort of cadres who were leaving South Africa to evade police attention, receive training, and establish the overt ANC structures that were now illegal inside the country. Mbeki was detained twice by the police while attempting to leave the country, first in Rustenberg, when the group he was travelling with failed to pass themselves off as a touring football team, and then in Rhodesia. He arrived at the ANC's new headquarters in Dar es Salaam, Tanzania, in November 1962, and left shortly afterwards for England.

== Exile and early career ==
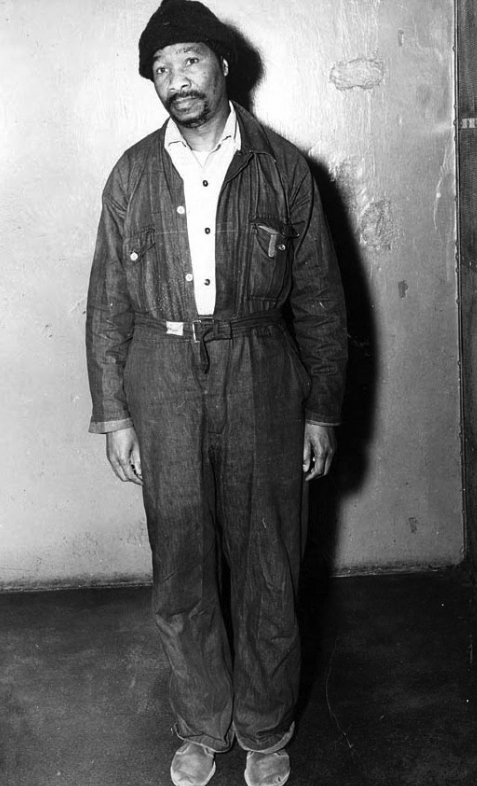
Govan Mbeki during the raid on Liliesleaf Farm, July 1963

=== 1962–69: England ===
While at Sussex, Mbeki was involved in ANC work and in broader organising for the English Anti-Apartheid Movement. Months after his arrival, his father was arrested during a Security Branch raid at Liliesleaf Farm in July 1963. During the ensuing Rivonia Trial, Mbeki appeared before the United Nations (UN) Special Committee on Apartheid and later led a student march from Brighton to London, a distance of fifty miles. At the conclusion of the trial, Govan and seven other ANC leaders, among them Nelson Mandela and Walter Sisulu, were sentenced to life imprisonment.

Mbeki completed his bachelor's degree in economics in May 1965 but, at the exhortation of O. R. Tambo, enrolled for a Master's in economics and development instead of returning to Africa to join Umkhonto we Sizwe (MK), the ANC's armed wing. His Master's dissertation was in economic geography. In addition to this and his political organising, he developed a deep fondness for Yeats, Brecht, Shakespeare, and blues music.After completing his Master's, in October 1966 he moved to London to work full-time for the propaganda section of the ANC's English headquarters.He remained active in the SACP, which was very closely allied to the ANC, and in 1967 he was appointed to the editorial board of its official magazine, the African Communist.

Throughout his time in England, Mbeki was the ward of O. R. Tambo and his wife Adelaide Tambo – in the absence of his parents, it was Adelaide and senior communist Michael Harmel who attended Mbeki's graduation ceremony in 1965. O. R. Tambo later became the ANC's longest-serving president, and he acted as Mbeki's "political mentor and patron" until his death in 1993. Other friends Mbeki made in England, including Ronnie Kasrils and brothers Essop Pahad and Aziz Pahad, were also among his key political allies in his later career.

=== 1969–71: Soviet Union ===
In February 1969, Mbeki was sent to Moscow in the Soviet Union to receive Marxist–Leninist political and ideological training – a fairly common practice, and even a rite of passage, among young people identified as belonging to the future generation of ANC and SACP political leaders. He was educated at the Lenin Institute, where, because of the secrecy required, he went by the alias "Jack Fortune". He excelled at the institute and in June 1970 was appointed to the Central Committee of the SACP, alongside Chris Hani. The last part of his training entailed military training, also a rite of passage, including in intelligence, guerrilla tactics, and weaponry. However, his biographer Mark Gevisser adduces that he was "not the ideal candidate for military life", and Max Sisulu, who trained alongside him, says that he always regarded Mbeki as better suited to political leadership than military leadership.

=== 1971–75: Lusaka ===
In April 1971, having been pulled out from military training, Mbeki was sent to Lusaka, Zambia, where the ANC-in-exile had set up its new headquarters under acting president Tambo. He was to fill the post of administrative secretary to the ANC Revolutionary Council, a body newly established to coordinate the political and military efforts of the ANC and SACP. He was later moved to the propaganda section, but continued to attend the council's meetings, and in 1975 he (again alongside Hani) was elected onto the ANC's top decision-making organ, the National Executive Committee. It was during this period that he began to ghostwrite some of Tambo's speeches and reports, and he accompanied Tambo on important occasions, such as to the infamous December 1972 meeting with Mangosuthu Buthelezi, the head of Inkatha, in London. In 1973, he helped to establish the ANC's office in Botswana, considered a "frontline" country because of its shared border with South Africa, where the ANC was attempting to re-establish its underground. However, although he travelled frequently in subsequent years, the ANC's Lusaka headquarters remained his central base.

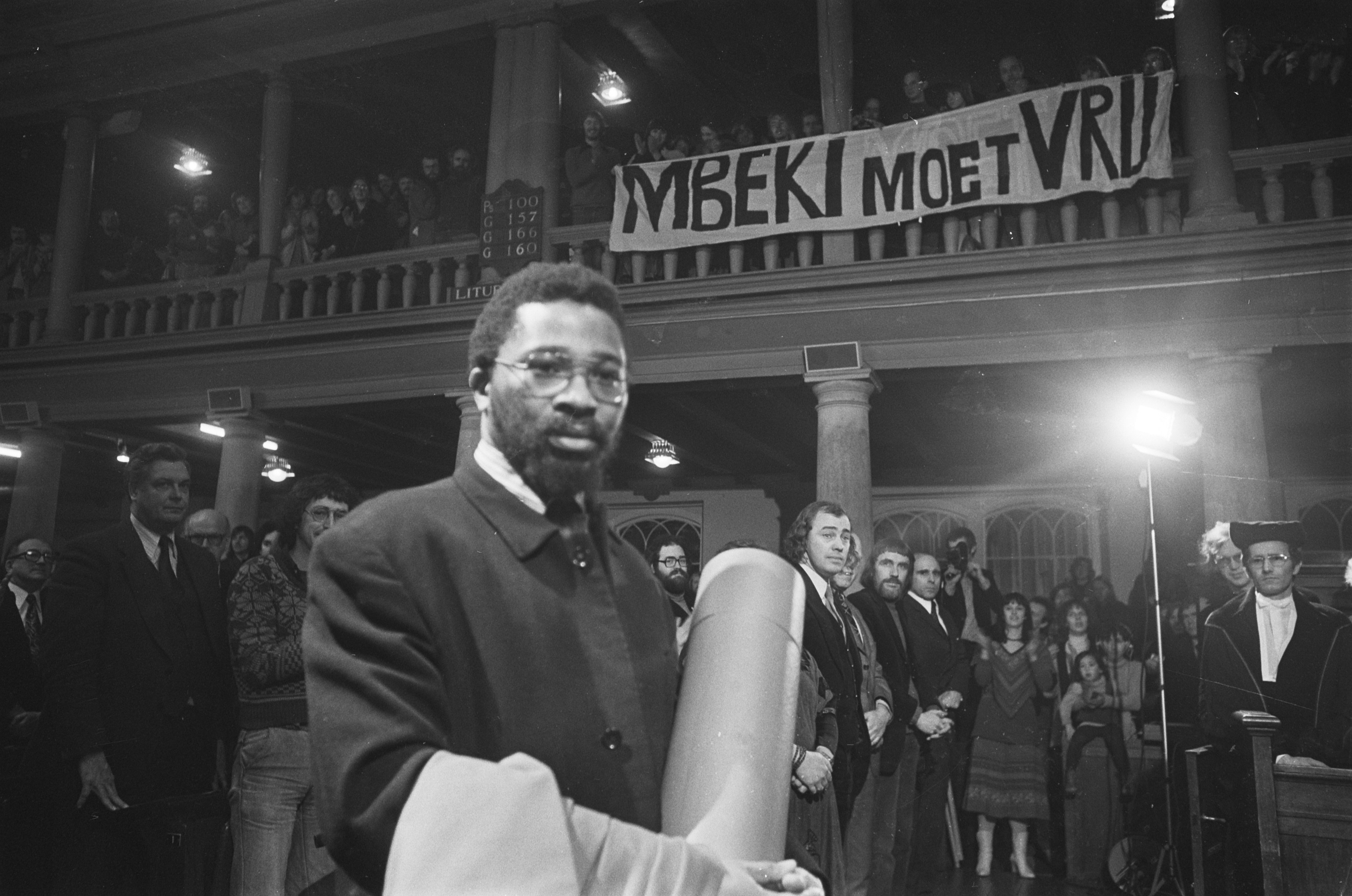
Mbeki's brother Moeletsi in Amsterdam in 1978, accepting an award on behalf of their father. The banner calls for Govan's release.

=== 1975–76: Swaziland ===
Between 1975 and 1976, Mbeki was instrumental in establishing the ANC's frontline base in Swaziland. He was first sent there to assess the political landscape in January 1975, under the cover of attending a UN conference. As part of this reconnaissance trip, he and his colleague Max Sisulu spent time with S'bu Ndebele, Max's sister Lindiwe Sisulu, and their associates in the Black Consciousness movement, which at the time was ascendent in neighbouring South Africa. Mbeki made a positive report to the ANC executive, and he was sent back to Swaziland to begin establishing the base. In Swaziland, he lived at Stanley Mabizela's family home in Manzini. Working with Albert Dhlomo, Mbeki was responsible for helping to re-establish underground ANC networks in the South African provinces of Natal and Transvaal, which shared a border with Swaziland. His counterpart inside South Africa was MK operative Jacob Zuma, who ran the Natal underground. According to Gevisser, the pair developed "an unlikely rapport". Mbeki was also responsible for recruiting new MK operatives, for liaising with South African student and labour activists, and for liaising with Inkatha, which was becoming dominant in Natal.

However, still another part of his duties was to act as the ANC's official representative in the country, and to maintain good diplomatic relations with the Swazi government. In March 1976, the government discovered that Mbeki was involved in military activity inside Swaziland, and he and Dhlomo – as well as Zuma, who was in the country illegally – were detained and then deported, though they managed to negotiate their deportation to the neutral territory of Mozambique rather than to South Africa. Mbeki's management of the Swaziland base later became a point of contention between him and Mac Maharaj, with whom his relationship has remained acrimonious decades later. In 1978, Maharaj and Mbeki argued at a top-level strategic meeting in Luanda, Angola, when Maharaj, who had been tasked with running the political underground, claimed that Mbeki's records from the Swaziland office were in fact "just an empty folder".

=== 1976–78: Nigeria ===
After being deported, Mbeki returned to Lusaka, where he was made Duma Nokwe's deputy in the ANC's Department of Information and Propaganda (DIP). In January 1977, he was posted to Lagos, Nigeria, where he was to be – as in Swaziland – the ANC's first representative to the country. Although there was some debate about whether the appointment was a signal that he had been sidelined, Gevisser says that Mbeki performed well in Lagos, establishing good relations with Olusegun Obasanjo's regime and establishing an ANC presence to eclipse that of its rival Pan Africanist Congress (PAC).

=== 1978–80: Political secretary ===
When he returned to Lusaka from Lagos in 1978, he was promoted again: he replaced Nokwe as head of DIP, and simultaneously was appointed Tambo's political secretary, an extremely influential position in which he became one of Tambo's closest advisors and confidantes. He also continued to ghostwrite for Tambo, now in a formal capacity. At DIP, his approach was encapsulated by the change he made to the department's name, replacing "propaganda" with "publicity". He eschewed the secrecy of earlier years and openly gave interviews and access to American journalists, to the disapproval of some hardline communists. According to various sources, he was responsible for reforming the public image of the ANC from that of a terrorist organisation to that of a "government-in-waiting".

When I look at Thabo, I look at my husband's son. Physically, they bear a striking resemblance... They are both perfectionists, but without the intolerance that comes from many who share that quality. They are loyal and true. They are their own harshest critics. They both have the gift to draw people to them... They were soul mates, different generations fusing at that particular time.

— Adelaide Tambo reflects on Mbeki's relationship with O. R. Tambo, June 2002

He established some of his own high-level intelligence networks, with key underground operatives reporting directly to him, and Gevisser claims that these led to the initiation of relationships with many of the domestic activists who later became his political allies. Moreover, he was responsible for innovating some of the vocabulary which became emblematic of the 1980s anti-apartheid struggle, which burgeoned in the aftermath of the 1976 Soweto uprising. Such phrases as "mass democratic movement", "people's power", and the exhortation to "make the country ungovernable" are attributed to Mbeki, and gained widespread popularity inside South Africa through Radio Freedom broadcasts written by DIP or by Mbeki personally. Zuma has said that it was Mbeki's "drafting skills" which enabled his ascendancy in the ANC and ultimately to the presidency.

In 1980, Mbeki led the ANC's delegation to Zimbabwe, where the party hoped to establish relations with Robert Mugabe's newly elected government. This was a sensitive mission, because the ANC had historically been strongly allied to the Zimbabwe African People's Union, the arch rival of Mugabe's ZANU-PF. Working primarily through Mugabe's righthand man, future Zimbabwean president Emmerson Mnangagwa, Mbeki negotiated an extraordinarily congenial agreement between ZANU-PF and the ANC. The agreement allowed the ANC to open an office in Zimbabwe and to move MK weapons and cadres over Zimbabwean borders; moreover, it committed the Zimbabwean military to assisting the ANC, and the government to providing MK cadres with Zimbabwean identity documents. However, Mbeki handed the running of the Salisbury office over to another ANC official, and the deal later collapsed.

=== 1980s: Negotiations ===
In 1985, PW Botha declared a State of Emergency and gave the army and police special powers. In 1986, the South African Army sent a captain in the South African Defence Force (SADF) to kill Mbeki. The plan was to put a bomb in his house in Lusaka, but the assassin was arrested by the Zambian police before he could go through with the plan. Also in 1985, Mbeki became the ANC's director of the Department of Information and Publicity and coordinated diplomatic campaigns to involve more white South Africans in anti-apartheid activities. In 1989, he rose in the ranks to head the ANC's Department of International Affairs and was involved in the ANC's negotiations with the South African government. Mbeki played a major role in turning the international media against apartheid. Raising the diplomatic profile of the ANC, Mbeki acted as a point of contact for foreign governments and international organisations and he was extremely successful in this position. Mbeki also played the role of ambassador to the steady flow of delegates from the elite sectors of white South Africa. These included academics, clerics, business people and representatives of liberal white groups who travelled to Lusaka to assess the ANC's views on a democratic, free South Africa. They also travelled to Los Angeles in a big group

Mbeki was seen as pragmatic, eloquent, rational, and urbane. He was known for his diplomatic style and sophistication. In the early 1980s, Mbeki, Jacob Zuma and Aziz Pahad were appointed by Tambo to conduct private talks with representatives of the National Party government. Twelve meetings between the parties took place between November 1987 and May 1990, most of them held at Mells Park House, a country house near Bath in Somerset, England. By September 1989, the team secretly met with Maritz Spaarwater and Mike Louw in a hotel in Switzerland. Known as "Operation Flair", PW Botha was kept informed of all the meetings. At the same time, Mandela and Kobie Coetzee, the Minister of Justice, were also holding secret talks. When Mbeki finally was able to return home to South Africa and was reunited with his own father, the elder Mbeki told a reporter, "You must remember that Thabo Mbeki is no longer my son. He is my comrade!" A news article pointed out that this was an expression of pride, explaining, "For Govan Mbeki, a son was a mere biological appendage; to be called a comrade, on the other hand, was the highest honour."

In the late 1970s, Mbeki made a number of trips to the United States in search of support among US corporations. Literate and funny, he made a wide circle of friends in New York City. Mbeki was appointed head of the ANC's information department in 1984 and then became head of the international department in 1989, reporting directly to Oliver Tambo, then President of the ANC. Tambo was Mbeki's long-time mentor. In 1985, Mbeki was a member of a delegation that began meeting secretly with representatives of the South African business community, and in 1989, he led the ANC delegation that conducted secret talks with the South African government. These talks led to the unbanning of the ANC and the release of political prisoners. He also participated in many of the other important negotiations between the ANC and the government that eventually led to the democratisation of South Africa. As a sign of goodwill, de Klerk set free a few of the ANC's top leadership at the end of 1989, among them Govan Mbeki.

== Rise to the presidency ==
On 2 February 1990, Botha's successor as state president, F. W. de Klerk, announced that the ANC and other political organisations would be unbanned, and ANC exiles began to return to South Africa. At the same time that it was to negotiate the end of apartheid, the ANC had to implement a significant internal reorganisation, absorbing into its official exile bodies the domestic ANC underground, released political prisoners, and other activists from the trade unions and the United Democratic Front. It also had an ageing leadership, meaning that a new generation of leaders had to be prepared for succession.

=== 1993: ANC chairperson ===
In the late 1980s and early 1990s, Mbeki's key role in the early negotiations made him a likely contender for top leadership positions in the party, and he was even considered to be in line for the ANC presidency. However, at the ANC's 48th National Conference in July 1991, its first national elective conference since 1960, Mbeki was not elected to any of the "Top Six" leadership positions. Sisulu was elected ANC deputy president, almost certainly as a compromise candidate, and trade unionist Cyril Ramaphosa was elected secretary general. According to historian Tom Lodge, Ramaphosa's election was a putsch carried out by the party's "internal wing", in defiance of the former exiles and political prisoners who had hitherto dominated the ANC's leadership. Over the next three years, Ramaphosa also came to eclipse Mbeki as the party's central negotiator when he, not Mbeki, was appointed to lead the ANC's delegation to the CODESA talks. Once SACP leader Chris Hani was assassinated in April 1993, Ramaphosa became Mbeki's primary competition in the ANC succession battle. When Tambo died later the same month, Mbeki succeeded him as ANC national chairperson.

=== 1994: Deputy president ===
Well, I don't imagine that there's any such requirement. I mean, he's got very big feet. The shoes will be too big. What does that mean? Does it mean we start off by going to jail for 27 years and then sort of graduate from there, grow taller, wear strange shirts? It's not a rational expectation.

— Mbeki in 1997, on filling Mandela's shoes

Following the 1994 elections, South Africa's first under universal suffrage, Mbeki became one of the two national deputy presidents in the ANC-led Government of National Unity, in which Mandela was president. At the ANC's next national conference, held in December that year, Mbeki was elected unopposed to the ANC deputy presidency, also under Mandela. In June 1996, the National Party withdrew from the Government of National Unity and, with the second deputy, de Klerk, having thereby resigned, Mbeki became the sole deputy president.

The same year, as deputy president, Mbeki acted as a peace broker in what was then known as Zaire, following the First Congo War and the deposition of Zairean president Mobutu Sese Seko. Mbeki also took on increasing domestic responsibilities, including executive powers delegated to him by Mandela, to such an extent that Mandela called him "a de facto president". Mandela had made it clear publicly since early 1995 or earlier that he intended to retire after one term in office, and by then Mbeki was already seen as his most likely successor.

=== 1997: ANC president ===
In December 1997, the ANC's 50th National Conference elected Mbeki unopposed to succeed Mandela as ANC president. On some accounts, the election was not contested because the top leadership had prepared assiduously for the conference, lobbying and negotiating on Mbeki's behalf in the interest of unity and continuity. Pursuant to the 1999 national elections, which the ANC won by a significant majority, Mbeki was elected president of South Africa. He was re-elected for a second term in 2002.

== Presidency of South Africa (1999–2008) ==
Ours is a capitalist society. It is therefore inevitable that, in part – and I repeat, in part – we must address this goal of deracialisation within the context of the property relations characteristic [of] a capitalist economy.

— Mbeki in 1999

=== Economic policy ===
Mbeki had been highly involved in economic policy as deputy president, especially in spearheading the Growth, Employment and Redistribution (GEAR) programme, which was introduced in 1996 and remained a cornerstone of Mbeki's administration after 1999. In comparison to the Reconstruction and Development Programme policy which had been the basis of the ANC's platform in 1994, GEAR placed less emphasis on developmental and redistributive imperatives, and subscribed to elements of the liberalisation, deregulation, and privatisation at the centre of Washington Consensus-style reforms. It was therefore viewed by some as a "policy reversal" and embrace of neoliberalism, and thus as an abandonment of the ANC's socialist principles. Mbeki also emphasised communication between government, business, and labour, establishing four working groups – for big business, black business, trade unions, and commercial agriculture – under which ministers, senior officials, and Mbeki himself met regularly with business and union leaders to build trust and explore solutions to structural economic problems.

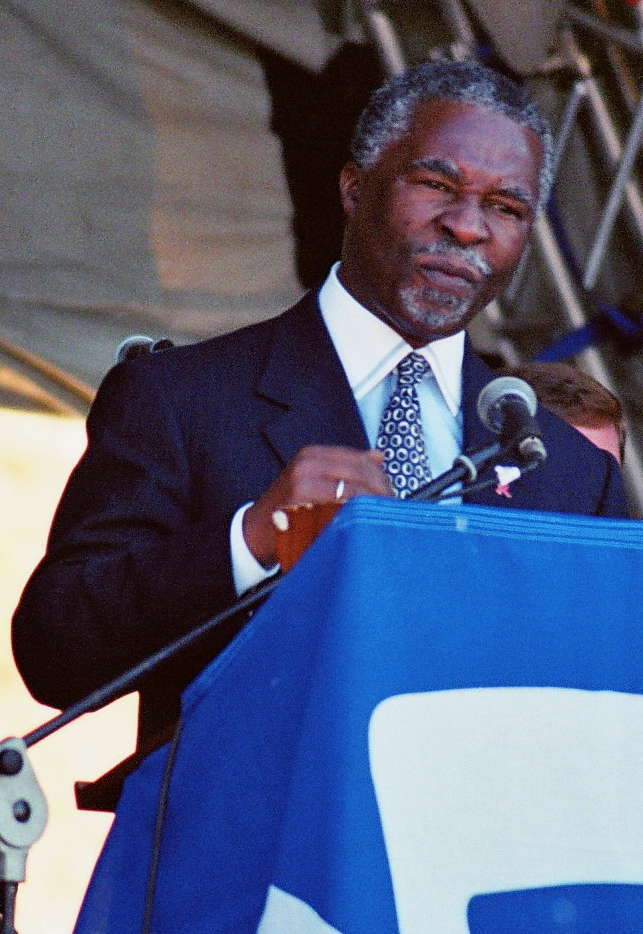
Mbeki speaks to District Six land claimants in Cape Town, 2001.

Conservative groups such as the Cato Institute commended Mbeki's macroeconomic policies, which reduced the budget deficit and public debt and which according to them likely played a role in increasing economic growth. According to the Free Market Foundation, during the Mbeki presidency, average annualised quarter-on-quarter GDP growth was 4.2%, and average annual inflation was 5.7%. On the other hand, the shift alienated leftists, including inside in the ANC and its Tripartite Alliance. Zwelinzima Vavi of the Congress of South African Trade Unions (COSATU) was an outspoken critic of Mbeki's "market-friendly" economic policies, claiming that Mbeki's "flirtation" with neoliberalism had been "absolutely disastrous" for development, and especially for the labour-intensive development required to address South Africa's high unemployment rate. The discord between Mbeki and the left was on public display by December 2002, when Mbeki attacked what he called divisive "ultra-leftists" in a speech to the ANC's 51st National Conference.

However, Mbeki clearly never subscribed to undiluted neoliberalism. He retained various social democratic programmes and principles, and generally endorsed a mixed economy in South Africa. One of the ANC's slogans in the campaign for his 2004 re-election was "A people's contract for growth and development." He popularised the concept of a dual or two-track economy in South Africa, with severe underdevelopment in one segment of the population, and, for example in a 2003 newsletter, argued that high growth alone would only benefit the developed segment, without significant trickle-down benefits for the rest of the population. Yet, somewhat paradoxically, he explicitly advocated state support for the creation of a black capitalist class in South Africa. The government's black economic empowerment policy, which was expanded and consolidated under his administration, was criticised precisely for benefitting only a small black elite and thereby failing to address inequality.

=== Foreign policy ===
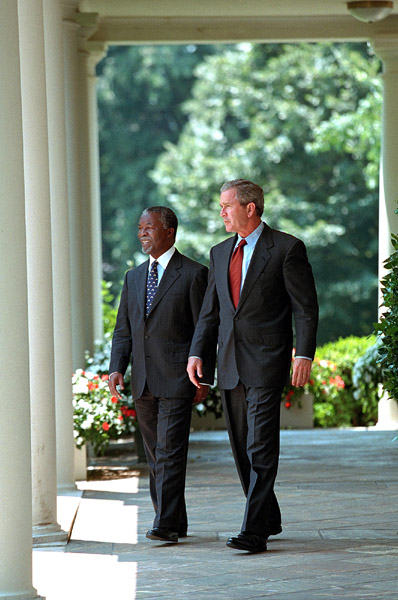
Mbeki with American President George W. Bush at the White House, June 2001

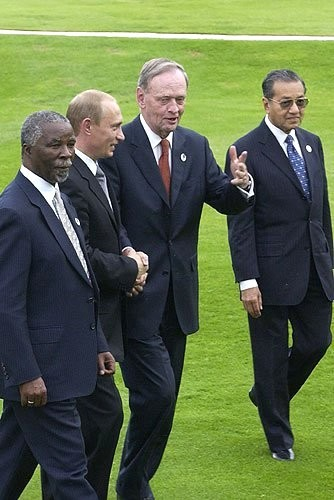
Mbeki with Russian President Vladimir Putin, Canadian Prime Minister Jean Chrétien and the Malaysian Prime Minister Mahathir Mohamad in June 2003

According to academic and diplomat Gerrit Olivier, during his presidency Mbeki "succeeded in placing Africa high on the global agenda." He was known for his pan-Africanism, having emphasised related themes both in his famous "I am an African" speech in 1996 and in his first speech to Parliament as president in June 1999, when he foregrounded his trademark ideal of an "African renaissance". He advocated for greater solidarity among African countries and, in place of reliance on Western intervention and aid, for greater self-sufficiency for the African continent. Simultaneously, however, he argued for increased developmental aid to Africa. He called for Western leaders to address global apartheid and unequal development, most memorably in a speech to the World Summit on Sustainable Development in Johannesburg in August 2002.

==== Africa ====
Although Mbeki also forged strategic individual relationships with key African leaders, especially the heads of state of Nigeria, Algeria, Mozambique, and Tanzania, perhaps his central foreign policy instrument was multilateral cooperation. Mbeki's government, and Mbeki personally, are frequently cited as the single most significant driving force behind the creation in 2001 of the New Partnership for Africa's Development (NEPAD), which aims to develop a framework for accelerating economic development and cooperation in Africa. Olivier calls Mbeki the "seminal thinker" behind NEPAD and its "principal author and articulator". According to academic Chris Landsberg, NEPAD's central principle – "African leaders holding one another accountable in exchange for the recommitment of the industrialised world to Africa's development" – epitomised Mbeki's strategy in Africa. Mbeki was also involved in the dissolution of the Organisation of African Unity and its replacement by the African Union (AU), of which he became the inaugural chairperson in 2002, and his government spearheaded the introduction of the AU's African Peer Review Mechanism in 2003. He was twice chairperson of the Southern African Development Community (SADC), first from 1999 to 2000 and second, briefly, in 2008. Through these multilateral organisations and by contributing forces to various United Nations (UN) peacekeeping missions, Mbeki and his government were involved in peacekeeping initiatives in African countries including Zimbabwe, Ethiopia and Eritrea, Liberia, the Democratic Republic of Congo, and Burundi.

==== Global South ====
Outside Africa, Mbeki was the chairperson of the Non-Aligned Movement between 1999 and 2003 and the chairperson of the Group of 77 + China in 2006. He also pursued South-South solidarity in a coalition with India and Brazil under the IBSA Dialogue Forum, which was launched in June 2003 and held its first summit in September 2006. The IBSA countries together pressed for changes in the agricultural subsidy regimes of developed countries at the 2003 World Trade Organisation conference, and also pressed for reforms at the UN which would allow developing countries a stronger role. Indeed, Mbeki had called for reform at the UN as early as 1999 and 2000.

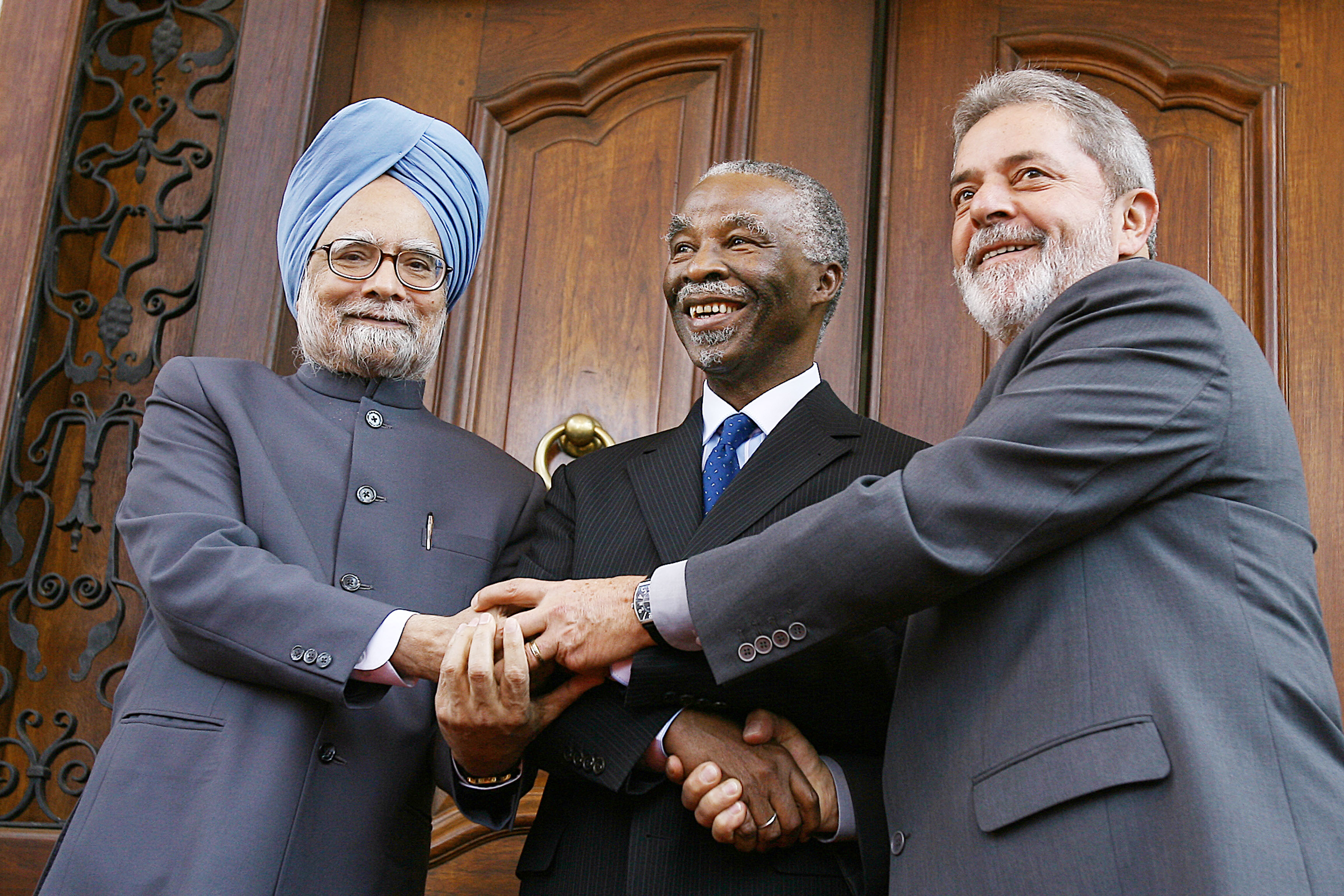
Mbeki with Brazilian President Lula da Silva and Indian Prime Minister Manmohan Singh at the second IBSA summit in Pretoria, October 2007

In 2007, following a prolonged diplomatic campaign, South Africa secured a non-permanent seat on the UN Security Council for a two-year term. Controversially, in February 2007, South Africa followed Russia and China in voting against a draft resolution calling for an end to political detentions and military attacks against ethnic minorities in Myanmar. Mbeki later told the media that the resolution exceeded the Security Council's mandate, and that its tabling had been illegal in terms of international law.

=== Quiet diplomacy in Zimbabwe ===
Mbeki's presidency coincided with an escalating political and economic crisis in South Africa's neighbour, Zimbabwe, under president Mugabe of ZANU-PF. Problems included land invasions under the "fast-track" land reform programme, political violence and state-sponsored human rights violations, and hyperinflation. With SADC's endorsement, Mbeki frequently acted as a mediator between ZANU-PF and the Zimbabwean opposition. However, controversially, his policy towards the Mugabe regime was one of non-confrontational "quiet diplomacy" and "constructive engagement": he refused to condemn Mugabe and instead attempted to persuade him to accept gradual political reforms. He was firmly opposed to forcible or manufactured regime change in Zimbabwe, and also opposed the use of sanctions. The Economist posited an "Mbeki doctrine" holding that South Africa "cannot impose its will on others, but it can help to deal with instability in African countries by offering its resources and its leadership to bring rival groups together, and to keep things calm until an election is safely held." Mbeki said in 2004:

...the critical role we should play is to assist the Zimbabweans to find each other, really to agree among themselves about the political, economic, social, other solutions that their country needs. We could have stepped aside from that task and then shouted, and that would be the end of our contribution... They would shout back at us and that would be the end of the story. I'm actually the only head of government that I know anywhere in the world who has actually gone to Zimbabwe and spoken publicly very critically of the things that they are doing.

The motives behind Mbeki's Zimbabwe policy have been interpreted in various ways: for example, some suggest that he was attempting to maintain economic stability in Zimbabwe and therefore to protect South African economic interests, while others cite his attachment to ideals of African solidarity and opposition to what he perceived as quasi-imperial Western interference in Africa. In any case, Mbeki's policy on Zimbabwe attracted widespread criticism both domestically and internationally. Some also questioned Mbeki's neutrality in his role as mediator. After a South African observer mission endorsed the result of the Zimbabwean presidential election of 2002, in which Mugabe was re-elected, Zimbabwean opposition leader Morgan Tsvangirai accused Mbeki of being a "dishonest broker" and his government of becoming "part of the Zimbabwe problem because its actions are worsening the crisis." Commentators later said that Mbeki's soft stance on Mugabe during this period permanently damaged relations between South Africa and the Zimbabwean opposition. A South African government observer mission also endorsed the result of the Zimbabwean parliamentary elections of 2005, apparently leading Tsvangirai's party, the Movement for Democratic Change (MDC), to effectively sever relations with Mbeki's administration.

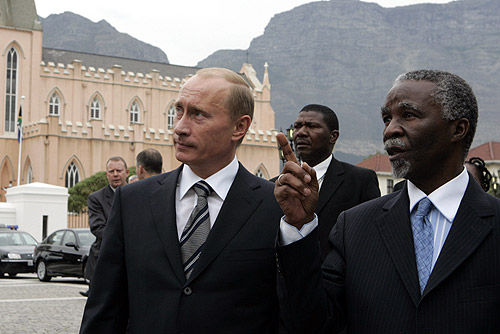
Mbeki with Russian President Vladimir Putin in Cape Town, September 2006

==== Power-sharing negotiations ====
Following another contested election in Zimbabwe – after which Mbeki controversially denied that there was a "crisis" in Zimbabwe – the MDC and ZANU-PF entered into negotiations towards the formation of a power-sharing government, with talks beginning in July 2008. Mbeki mediated the negotiations and brokered the resulting power-sharing agreement, signed on 15 September 2008, which retained Mugabe as president but diluted his executive power across posts to be held by opposition leaders.

=== HIV/AIDS ===
==== Policy and treatment ====
According to political scientist Jeffrey Herbst, Mbeki's HIV/AIDS policies were "bizarre at best, severely negligent at worst." In 2000, amid a burgeoning HIV/AIDS epidemic in South Africa, Mbeki's government launched the HIV/AIDS/STD Strategic Plan for South Africa, 2000–2005, a "multi-sectoral" plan which was criticised by HIV/AIDS activists for lacking concrete timeframes and failing to commit to antiretroviral treatment programmes. Indeed, according to economist Nicoli Nattrass, resistance to the roll-out of antiretroviral drugs for prevention and treatment became central to the HIV/AIDS policy of Mbeki's government in subsequent years. A national mother-to-child transmission prevention programme was not introduced until 2002, when it was mandated by the Constitutional Court in response to a successful legal challenge by the Treatment Action Campaign. Similarly, chronic highly active antiretroviral therapy for AIDS-sick people was not introduced in the public healthcare system until late 2003, reportedly at the insistence of some members of Mbeki's cabinet. According to Nattrass, better access to antiretroviral drugs in South Africa could have prevented about 171,000 HIV infections and 343,000 deaths between 1999 and 2007. In November 2008, a Harvard University study estimated that more than 330,000 people died between 2000 and 2005 due to insufficient antiretroviral programmes under Mbeki's government.

Even after these programmes were introduced, Mbeki's appointee as Minister of Health, Manto Tshabalala-Msimang, continued to advocate publicly for unproven alternative treatments in place of antiretrovirals, leading to continual calls by civil society for her dismissal. In late 2006, the cabinet transferred responsibility for AIDS policy from Tshabalala-Msimang to Deputy President Phumzile Mlambo-Ngcuka, who subsequently spearheaded a new draft National Strategic Plan on HIV/AIDS.

==== Association with denialism ====
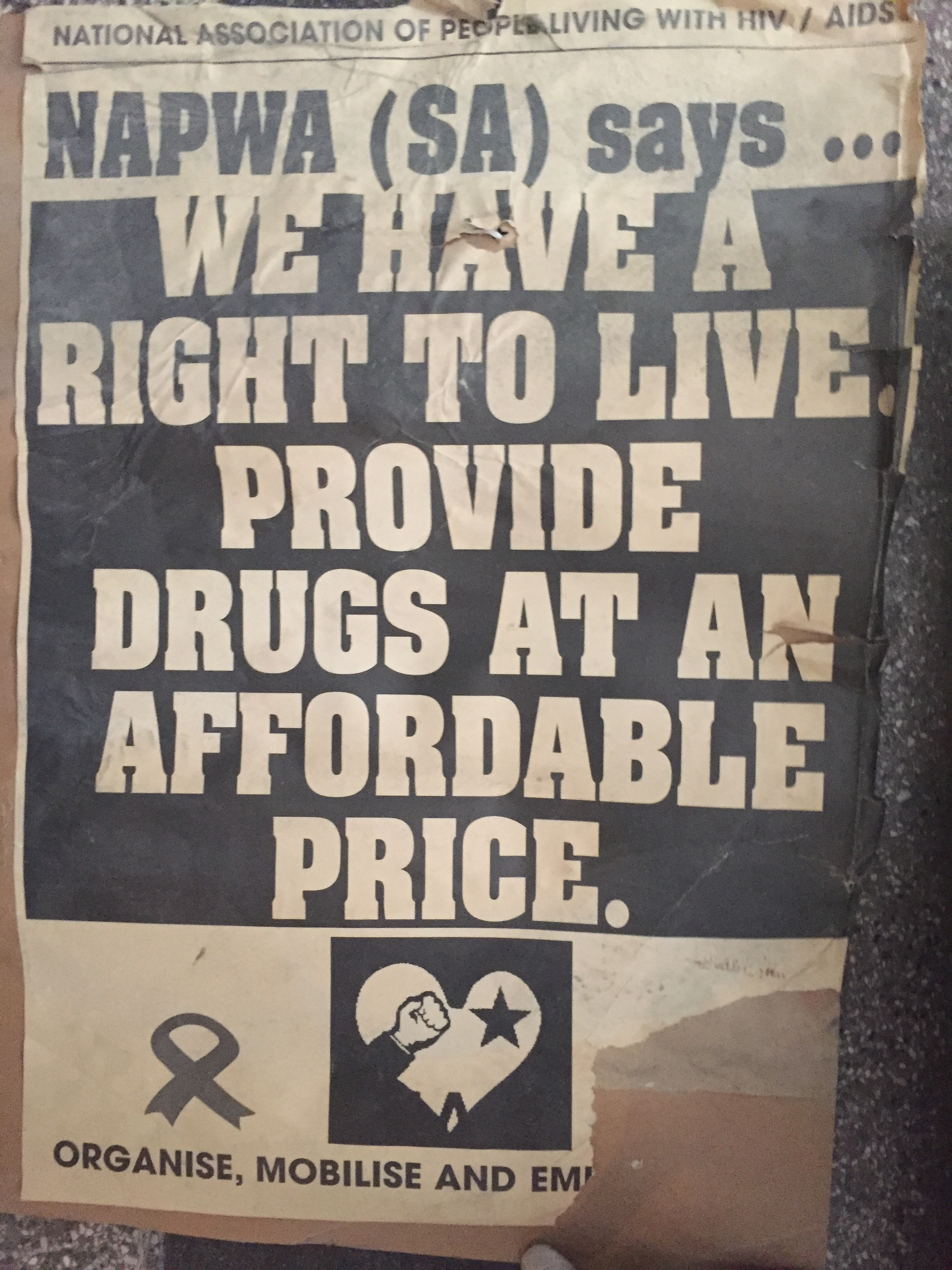
Protest poster at the XIII International AIDS Conference in Durban, July 2000

While president, Mbeki was also criticised for his public messaging on HIV/AIDS. He was viewed as sympathetic to or influenced by the views of a small minority of scientists who challenged the scientific consensus that HIV caused AIDS and that antiretroviral drugs were the most effective means of treatment. In an April 2000 letter to UN secretary-general Kofi Annan and the heads of state of the United States, United Kingdom, Germany, and France, Mbeki pointed to differences in how the AIDS epidemic had manifested in Africa and in the West, and committed to "the search for specific and targeted responses to the specifically African incidence of HIV-AIDS." He also defended scientists who had challenged the scientific consensus on AIDS:

Not long ago, in our own country, people were killed, tortured, imprisoned and prohibited from being quoted in private and in public because the established authority believed that their views were dangerous and discredited. We are now being asked to do precisely the same thing that the racist apartheid tyranny we opposed did, because, it is said, there exists a scientific view that is supported by the majority, against which dissent is prohibited... People who otherwise would fight very hard to defend the critically important rights of freedom of thought and speech occupy, with regard to the HIV-AIDS issue, the frontline in the campaign of intellectual intimidation and terrorism...

The letter was leaked to The Washington Post and caused controversy. During the same period, Mbeki convened a panel to investigate the cause of AIDS, staffed by researchers who believed that AIDS was caused by malnutrition and parasites as well as by orthodox researchers. In July 2000, opening the 13th International AIDS Conference in Durban, he proposed that the "disturbing phenomenon of the collapse of immune systems among millions of our people" was the result of various factors, especially poverty, and that "we could not blame everything on a single virus." It was characteristic of Mbeki's stance on HIV/AIDS to draw attention to socioeconomic differences between the West and Africa, emphasising the importance of poverty in poor health outcomes in Africa, and to insist that African countries should not be asked blindly to accept Western scientific theories and policy models. Commentators speculate that his stance was motivated by suspicion of the West and was a response to what he perceived as racist stereotypes of the continent and its people. For example, in October 2001, in a speech at the University of Fort Hare, he said of the West: "Convinced that we are but natural-born, promiscuous carriers of germs, unique in the world, they proclaim that our continent is doomed to an inevitable mortal end because of our unconquerable devotion to the sin of lust."

Mbeki announced in October 2000 that he would withdraw from the public debate on HIV/AIDS science, and in 2002 his cabinet staunchly affirmed that HIV causes AIDS. However, critics claimed that he continued to influence – and impede – HIV/AIDS policy, a charge which Mbeki denied. AIDS activist Zackie Achmat said in 2002 that "Mbeki epitomizes leadership in denial and his stand has fuelled government inaction." Gevisser writes that in 2007 Mbeki continued to defend his position on HIV/AIDS, and directed Gevisser to a controversial and anonymous ANC discussion document titled Castro Hlongwane, Caravans, Cats, Geese, Foot & Mouth and Statistics: HIV/Aids and the Struggle for the Humanisation of the African. The Gevisser biography also says that, while Mbeki never explicitly denied the link between HIV and AIDS, he is a "profound sceptic" – as Mbeki himself wrote in 2016, in a newsletter cautioning "great care and caution" in the use of antiretrovirals, he had not denied that HIV caused AIDS but that "a virus [could] cause a syndrome." He is generally referred to as an HIV/AIDS "dissident" rather than an outright denialist, although Nattrass questions the value of that distinction.

=== FIFA World Cup bid ===
As president, Mbeki spearheaded South Africa's successful bid to host the 2010 FIFA World Cup. Commentators, and Mbeki himself, frequently linked the bid to his vision for an African renaissance. In 2015, amid an American investigation into corruption at FIFA, soccer administrator Chuck Blazer testified that, between 2004 and 2011, he and other FIFA executives had received bribes in connection with South Africa's bid. Mbeki denied any knowledge of the bribes.

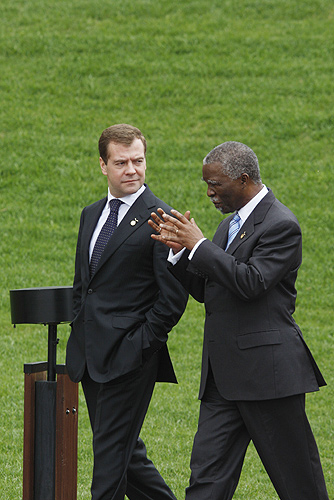
Mbeki with Russian President Dmitry Medvedev at the 34th G8 summit, July 2008

=== Electricity crisis ===
In late 2007, Mbeki's government announced that the public power utility, Eskom, would introduce electricity rationing or rolling blackouts, commonly known in South Africa as loadshedding. In subsequent months, Mbeki publicly apologised, acknowledging that the government had failed to heed Eskom's warnings, offered regularly for several consecutive years, that infrastructure investments were required to avoid energy shortages – in his words, "Eskom was right and government was wrong." However, some analysts suggested that insufficient investment was not the hindrance to electricity supply, and that other policy decisions by government and at Eskom, including the implementation of black economic empowerment criteria in coal procurement contracts, had contributed to the crisis. In his last State of the Nation address in February 2008, Mbeki repeated the apology and devoted nearly three pages of his speech to government's plans for addressing the energy crisis.

=== 2008 xenophobic attacks ===
In May 2008, a series of riots took place in a number of South African townships, mainly in Gauteng province, when South African residents violently attacked migrants from other African countries. At least 62 people were killed, several hundred injured, and many thousand displaced. To contain the violence, Mbeki deployed the army to affected areas – the first such deployment to a civilian area since the end of apartheid. In a televised address towards the end of the saga, Mbeki called the attacks "an absolute disgrace", saying, "Never since the birth of our democracy have we witnessed such callousness."

Some commentators argued that Mbeki's government had failed to acknowledge or sufficiently to address growing xenophobia in South Africa in the years preceding the attacks. Indeed, the AU's African Peer Review Mechanism had reported in 2006 that xenophobia was an urgent concern in South Africa. These criticisms were often linked to criticisms of Mbeki's policy in Zimbabwe, because a large proportion of South Africa's growing foreign-born population were Zimbabwean refugees. Moreover, when Mbeki argued that the attacks had other motives, both economic and "criminal", some critics accused him of "xenophobia denialism" and of refusing to acknowledge the genuine xenophobic sentiment in parts of the population.

== Succession ==
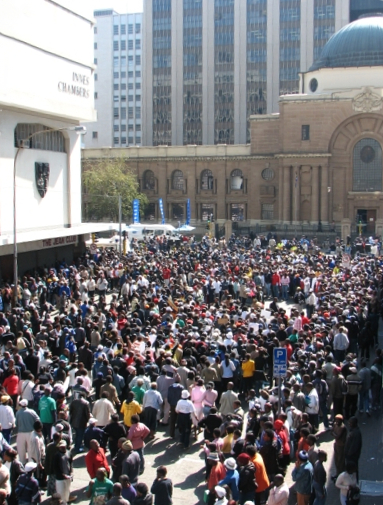
Zuma supporters outside the Johannesburg High Court during Zuma's rape trial, May 2006

=== Polokwane conference ===
In June 2005, Mbeki removed Zuma from his post as national deputy president, after Zuma's associate Schabir Shaik was convicted of making corrupt payments to Zuma in relation to the 1999 Arms Deal. The National Prosecuting Authority (NPA) charged Zuma with corruption later that year. However, Zuma remained deputy president of the ANC, and in subsequent years, the rivalry between Zuma and Mbeki and their allies intensified, with Zuma supporters frequently alleging that the charges against Zuma were politically motivated.

By 2007, Zuma had emerged as an apparent contender in the ANC's next presidential elections, to be held at the party's 52nd National Conference in Polokwane, Limpopo. By April of that year, it was also clear that Mbeki intended to stand for a third term as ANC president. Mbeki's term as national president would expire in 2009, and he had said in 2006 that he had no intention of having the Constitution changed to permit him a third term in office, saying, "By the end of 2009, I will have been in a senior position in government for 15 years. I think that's too long." However, the ANC lacked internal term limits, and some suspected that he intended to continue to exert substantial influence over the government through the ANC presidency.

Zuma drew substantial support from the left wing of the party, especially through the ANC Youth League and the ANC's partners in the Tripartite Alliance, the South African Communist Party and COSATU, with whom Mbeki's relationship was extremely poor. At the elective conference, on 18 December, Mbeki lost the presidential election to Zuma, gaining less than 40% of the vote. According to ANC tradition, as ANC president Zuma would become the party's presidential candidate in the 2009 general election, and therefore, given the ANC's substantial electoral majority, was overwhelmingly likely to succeed Mbeki as national president in 2009.

=== High court finding and appeal ===
On 12 September 2008, Pietermaritzburg High Court judge Chris Nicholson set aside the corruption charges against Zuma. He found that the charges were unlawful on the procedural grounds that the NPA had not given Zuma adequate opportunity to make representations. Nicholson also lent his support to allegations that Zuma's charges had been politically motivated, saying that he was "not convinced that [Zuma] was incorrect when he averred political meddling in his prosecution" and that the case seemed to be part of "some great political contest or game." Mbeki later applied to the Constitutional Court to appeal the judgement, calling Nicholson's findings about political interference "vexatious, scandalous and prejudicial." The NPA also appealed, and in January 2009 the Supreme Court of Appeal found in its favour and overturned Nicholson's ruling. Partially redeeming Mbeki, the appellate court said that Nicholson's allegations of political interference had been irrelevant to Nicholson's decision and had apparently derived from Nicholson's "own conspiracy theory."

=== Resignation ===
However, shortly after Nicholson delivered his judgement and months before the appeal was heard, the Zuma-aligned ANC National Executive Committee, as elected at the Polokwane conference, "recalled" Mbeki, asking him to resign as national president. The National Executive Committee is a party political body and therefore lacked the constitutional authority to remove Mbeki directly, but the ANC-controlled Parliament could have effected his removal had he not acquiesced voluntarily. On 20 September 2008, a spokesman announced that Mbeki would resign. In court papers filed later that week, Mbeki said that it was Nicholson's findings which had "led to my being recalled by my political party, the ANC – a request I have acceded to as a committed and loyal member of the ANC for the past 52 years."

In the aftermath of his announcement, at least 11 cabinet ministers and three deputy ministers – including Deputy President Mlambo-Ngcuka and Minister of Finance Trevor Manuel – announced that they would also resign. Mbeki's resignation took effect on 25 September, and he was replaced as national president by Kgalema Motlanthe, who had been elected ANC deputy president at the Polokwane conference.

== Post-presidency (2008–present) ==
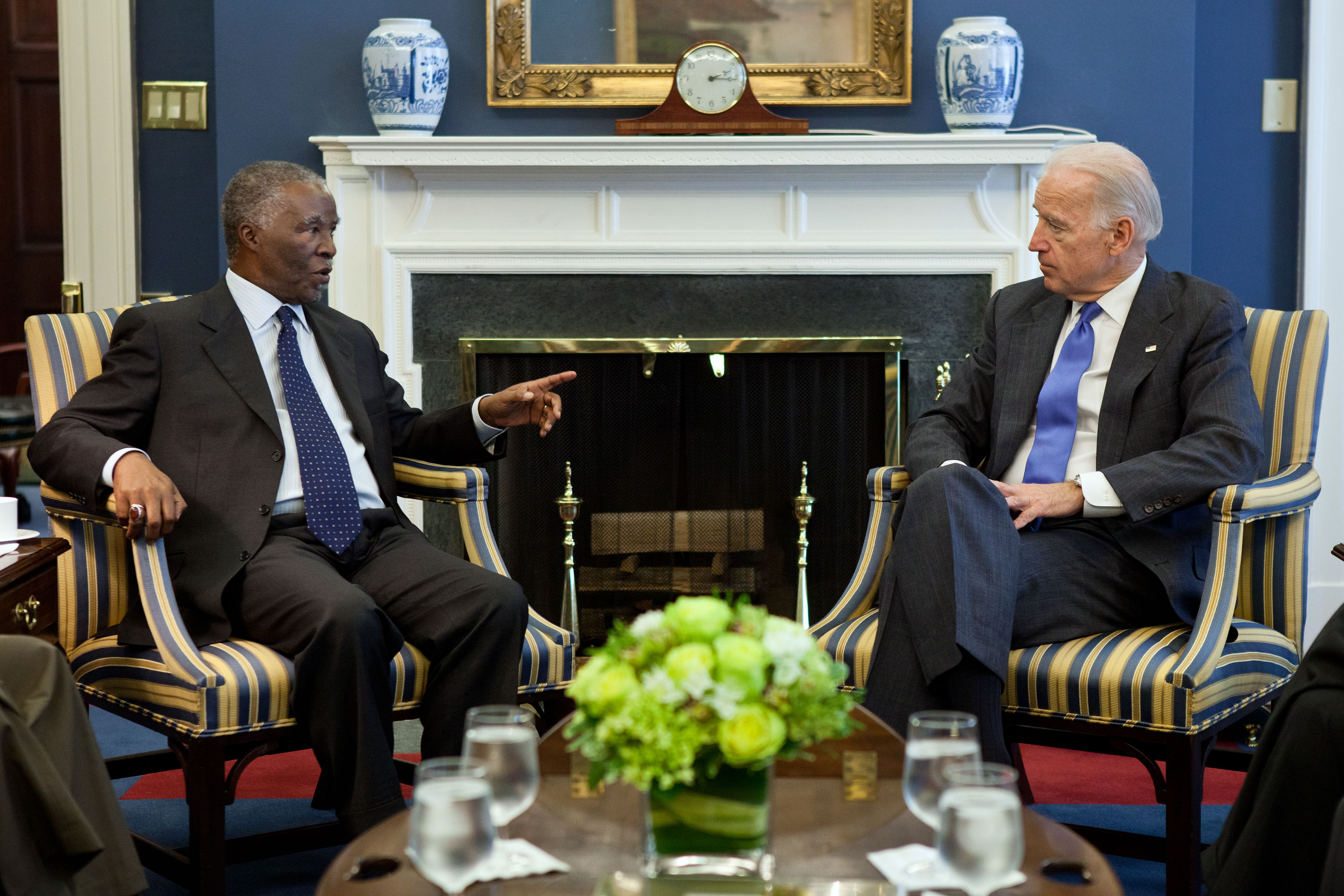
Mbeki with American Vice President Joe Biden in the West Wing, April 2011

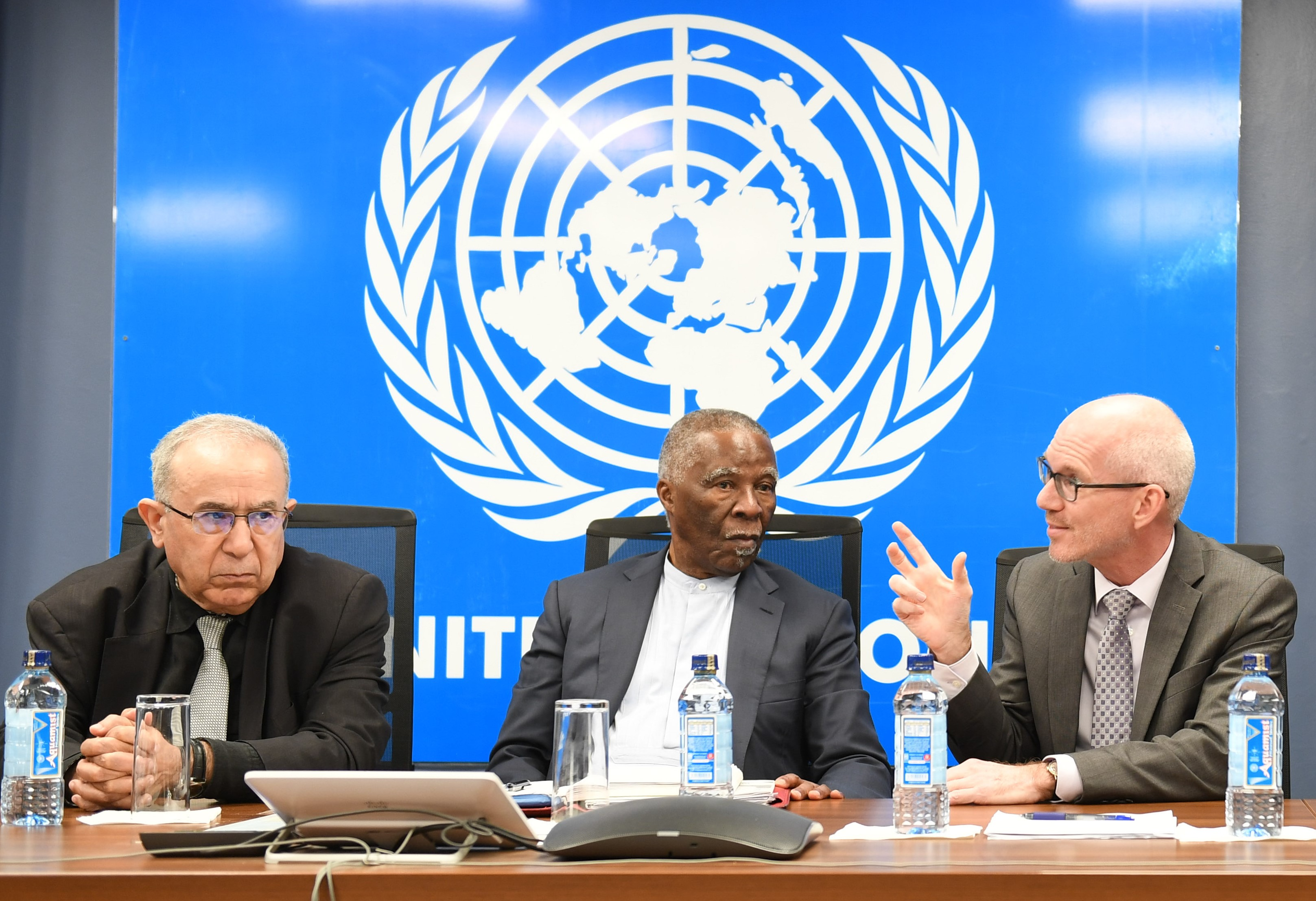
Mbeki at a United Nations meeting on Sudan, July 2019

=== Party politics ===
After his resignation from the presidency, Mbeki retained his ANC membership but retreated from party politics. In the meantime, the Congress of the People (Cope) was founded as a breakaway party, composed largely of former ANC members known to be Mbeki loyalists. There were rumours that Mbeki was involved in Cope and would perhaps defect to it, especially after his mother Epainette, widow of ANC stalwart Govan, began attending Cope election rallies in the family's native Eastern Cape. According to political analyst Susan Booysen, although Mbeki "would never emerge from the silent, invisible wings onto centre stage... the whole Cope plot carried the 'Mbeki' stamp."

Mbeki began again to appear at ANC events and to comment on ANC politics from around 2011. Although he has since said that he continued to vote for the ANC in the interim, he did not campaign on its behalf at any time during the Zuma presidency, which lasted between 2009 and 2018. In more recent years, he has been fairly vocal in reflecting publicly about perceived problems in the ANC and its leadership and about the country's economic problems and policies.

=== International mediation ===
Motlanthe asked Mbeki to remain in his role as mediator in Zimbabwe after his resignation in 2008, and he later returned to Zimbabwe, in 2020, to mediate a further political dispute. He also continued to chair the long-serving AU High-level Implementation Panel for Sudan and South Sudan, which in 2016 brokered an agreement between warring Sudanese parties to begin peace negotiations. Although he remained critical of the UN's interventions in Africa, he also chaired the UN Economic Commission for Africa High-Level Panel on Illicit Financial Flows from Africa, which was established in collaboration with the AU in 2011.

=== Philanthropy ===
The Thabo Mbeki Foundation was launched on 10 October 2010, ahead of a three-day conference. Its mission centres around Mbeki's trademark "African renaissance", and the objective of promoting Africa's political, social, economic, and cultural development. It was launched in tandem with the Thabo Mbeki African Leadership Institute, which aims to train leaders capable of contributing to the foundation's objectives.

== Personality and public image ==
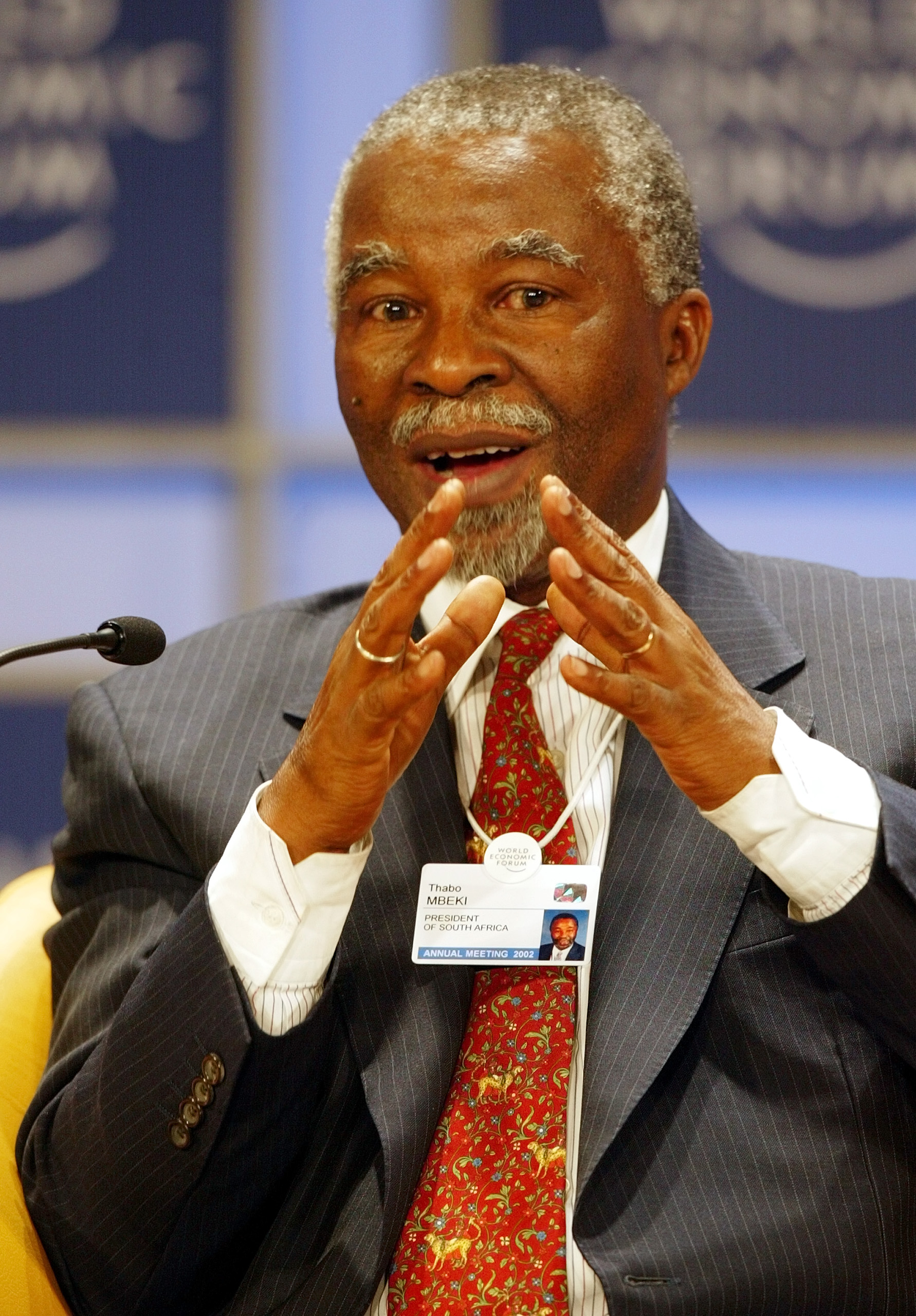
Mbeki at the World Economic Forum in New York, February 2002

Mbeki has sometimes been characterised as remote and academic, although in his second campaign for the Presidency in 2004, many observers described him as finally relaxing into more traditional ways of campaigning, sometimes dancing at events and even kissing babies. Mbeki used his weekly column in the ANC newsletter ANC Today, to produce discussions on a variety of topics. He sometimes used his column to deliver pointed invective against political opponents, and at other times used it as a kind of professor of political theory, educating ANC cadres on the intellectual justifications for African National Congress policy. Although these columns were remarkable for their dense prose, they often were used to influence news. Although Mbeki did not generally make a point of befriending or courting reporters, his columns and news events often yielded good results for his administration by ensuring that his message is a primary driving force of news coverage. Indeed, in initiating his columns, Mbeki stated his view that the bulk of South African media sources did not speak for or to the South African majority, and stated his intent to use ANC Today to speak directly to his constituents rather than through the media.

Mbeki appears to have been at ease with the Internet and willing to quote from it. For instance, in a column discussing Hurricane Katrina, he cited Wikipedia, quoted at length a discussion of Katrina's lessons on American inequality from the Native American publication Indian Country Today, and then included excerpts from a David Brooks column in The New York Times in a discussion of why the events of Katrina illustrated the necessity for global development and redistribution of wealth.

His penchant for quoting diverse and sometimes obscure sources, both from the Internet and from a wide variety of books, made his column an interesting parallel to political blogs although the ANC does not describe it in these terms. His views on AIDS were supported by Internet searching which led him to so-called "AIDS denialist" websites; in this case, Mbeki's use of the Internet was roundly criticised and even ridiculed by opponents.

== Controversies ==
=== 1999 Arms Deal ===
There have been rumours and allegations, never proven or prosecuted and denied by Mbeki, that Mbeki was involved in or aware of corruption in the 1999 Arms Deal, a major defence procurement package negotiated while he was deputy president.

=== Crime ===
In 2004 President Thabo Mbeki made an attack on commentators who argued that violent crime was out of control in South Africa, calling them white racists who want the country to fail. He alleged that crime was falling and some journalists were distorting reality by depicting black people as "barbaric savages" who liked to rape and kill. Annual statistics published in September 2004 showed that most categories of crime were down, but some had challenged the figures' credibility and said that South Africa remained extremely dangerous, especially for women. In a column for the African National Congress website, the president rebuked the doubters. Mr Mbeki did not name journalist Charlene Smith who had championed victims of sexual violence since writing about her own rape, but quoted a recent article in which she said South Africa had the highest rate of rape and referred (apparently sarcastically) to her as an "internationally recognised expert on sexual violence". He said: "She was saying our cultures, traditions and religions as Africans inherently make every African man a potential rapist ... [a] view which defines the African people as barbaric savages." Mr Mbeki also described the newspaper The Citizen, and other commentators who challenged the apparent fall in crime, as pessimists who did not trust black rule.

In January 2007, the African Peer Review Mechanism (APRM) draft report on South Africa was released. This noted that South Africa had the world's second-highest murder rate, with about 50 people a day being killed, and that although serious crime was reported as falling, security analysts said that the use of violence in robberies, and rape, were more common. Mbeki in response said in an interview that fears of crime were exaggerated.

In December 2007 the final African Peer Review Mechanism (APRM) report on South Africa, again suggested that there was an unacceptably high level of violent crime in the country. President Mbeki said the suggestion of unacceptably high violent crime appeared to be an acceptance by the panel of what he called "a populist view". He challenged some of the statistics on crime, which he noted may have resulted from a weak information base, leading to wrong conclusions. Although rape statistics had been obtained from the South African Police Service, "this only denotes the incidents of rape that were reported, some of which could have resulted in acquittals" Mbeki indicated.

=== Debate with Archbishop Tutu ===
In 2004 the Archbishop Emeritus of Cape Town, Desmond Tutu, criticised President Mbeki for surrounding himself with "yes-men", not doing enough to improve the position of the poor and for promoting economic policies that only benefited a small black elite. He also accused Mbeki and the ANC of suppressing public debate. Mbeki responded that Tutu had never been an ANC member and defended the debates that took place within ANC branches and other public forums. He also asserted his belief in the value of democratic discussion by quoting the Chinese slogan "let a hundred flowers bloom", referring to the brief Hundred Flowers Campaign within the Chinese Communist Party in 1956–57.

The ANC Today newsletter featured several analyses of the debate, written by Mbeki and the ANC. The latter suggested that Tutu was an "icon" of "white elites", thereby suggesting that his political importance was overblown by the media; and while the article took pains to say that Tutu had not sought this status, it was described in the press as a particularly pointed and personal critique of Tutu. Tutu responded that he would pray for Mbeki as he had prayed for the officials of the apartheid government.

== Political commentary post-presidency ==
On 10 October 2024, Mbeki wrote a letter to Mr Matome Chiloane, Member of the Executive for the Gauteng Education Department (GED), criticizing the GED's handling of an incident of alleged racism at Pretoria High School for Girls. The letter was copied to the Gauteng Premier, Mr Phanyaza Lesufi. The GED had been criticized in the South African media for claiming that there was racism at Pretoria High School for Girls without proof of such.

== Personal life and family ==
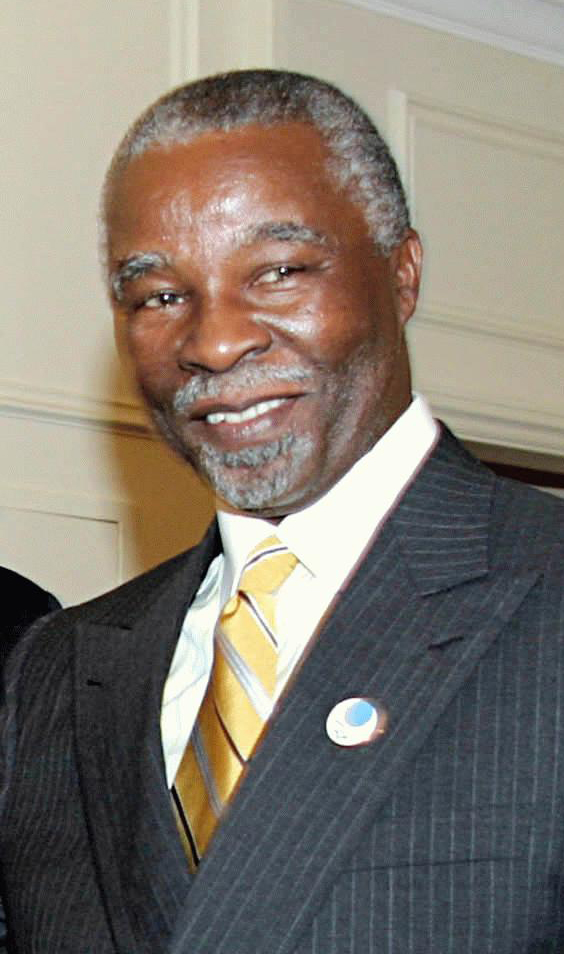
Mbeki in 2003

In October 1959, Mbeki had a son, Monwabisi Kwanda, with Olive Mpahlwa, a childhood friend which whom he had struck up a romance while at Lovedale. Kwanda was raised by his mother and later by Mbeki's mother, Epainette. He was last seen by his family in 1981 and is presumed to have died in exile, but the circumstances of his death remain unknown. Olive testified about his disappearance at the Truth and Reconciliation Commission in 1996, making an impassioned plea for those with information to step forward.

Mbeki's youngest brother, Jama, also disappeared in exile. He had spent his adolescence in Lesotho and was an activist in the Basutoland Congress Party (BCP) and its Lesotho Liberation Army. BCP was much closer to the PAC than to the ANC, and later became an avowed enemy of the latter. Jama disappeared in March 1982, after he skipped bail. According to an investigation commissioned by his family in the early 1990s, he was informed upon by a comrade, entrapped by security police, and killed on the side of a highway later in 1982. Mbeki's only living sibling, Moeletsi, was also educated abroad and is now a prominent economist. He often publicly criticised the policies of his brother's government.

Mbeki married Zanele Dlamini Mbeki in 1974, a social worker from Alexandra whom he met in London before his departure for Moscow. The wedding ceremony was held on 23 November at Farnham Castle in Surrey, England. Adelaide Tambo and Mendi Msimang stood in loco parentis for Mbeki, and Essop Pahad was his best man. They have no children together.

== Recognition ==
=== Honorary degrees ===
Mbeki has received many honorary degrees from South African and foreign universities. Mbeki received an honorary doctorate in business administration from the Arthur D Little Institute, Boston, in 1994. In 1995, he received honorary doctorate from the University of South Africa and an honorary doctorate of laws from Sussex University. Mbeki was awarded an honorary doctorate from Rand Afrikaans University in 1999. In 2000 he was awarded an honorary doctorate of laws from Glasgow Caledonian University. In 2004, he was awarded an honorary doctorate in commercial sciences by the University of Stellenbosch.

=== Orders and decorations ===
During Mbeki's official visit to Britain in 2001, he was made an honorary Knight Grand Cross of the Order of the Bath (GCB). The Mayor of Athens, Dora Bakoyannis, awarded Mbeki with the City of Athens Medal of Honour in 2005. During Mbeki's official visit to Sudan in 2005, he was awarded Sudan's Insignia of Honour in recognition of his role in resolving conflicts and working for development in the Continent. In 2007, Mbeki was made a Knight of the Most Venerable Order of the Hospital of Saint John of Jerusalem at St George's Cathedral in Cape Town by the current grand prior, Prince Richard, Duke of Gloucester.

=== Awards ===
Mbeki was awarded the Good Governance Award in 1997 by the US-based Corporate Council on Africa. He received the Newsmaker of the year award from Pretoria News Press Association in 2000 and repeated the honour in 2008, this time under the auspices of media research company Monitoring South Africa. In honour of his commitment to democracy in the new South Africa, Mbeki was awarded the Oliver Tambo/Johnny Makatini Freedom Award in 2000. Mbeki was awarded the Peace and Reconciliation Award at the Gandhi Awards for Reconciliation in Durban in 2003. In 2004, Mbeki was awarded the Good Brother Award by Washington, D.C.'s National Congress of Black Women for his commitment to gender equality and the emancipation of women in South Africa. In 2005, he was also awarded the Champion of the Earth Award by the United Nations. During the European-wide Action Week Against Racism in 2005, Mbeki was awarded the Rotterdamse Jongeren Raad (RJR) Antidiscrimination Award by the Netherlands. In 2006, he was awarded the Presidential Award for his outstanding service to economic growth and investor confidence in South Africa and Africa and for his role in the international arena by the South African Chambers of Commerce and Industry. In 2007 Mbeki was awarded the Confederation of African Football's Order of Merit for his contribution to football on the continent.

=== Patronages ===
- Thabo Mbeki Foundation
- Thabo Mbeki African Leadership Institute, an institute of the University of South Africa in partnership with the Thabo Mbeki Foundation
- Thabo Mbeki Presidential Library
- Thabo Mbeki School for Public and International Affairs based in UNISA.

=== Foreign honours ===
Cuba:

- Medal of the Order of José Martí (2001)

Italy:

- Knight Grand Cross with Collar Order of Merit of the Italian Republic (2002)

Jamaica:

- Member of the Order of Excellence (2003)

Zambia:

- Grand Commander of the Order of the Eagle of Zambia (2003)

United Kingdom:

- Knight Grand Cross of the Order of the Bath (2007)
- Knight of the Order of Saint John (2007)
- Honorary Knight Grand Cross of the Order of St Michael and St George (2000)

== See also ==
- History of the African National Congress
- Operation Vula
- 2008 South African presidential election
- Frank Chikane
- Joel Netshitenzhe
- Bulelani Ngcuka

== Notes ==
Political offices
New office	Deputy President of South Africa; 1994–1999; Served alongside: F. W. de Klerk (1994–1996)	Succeeded by Jacob Zuma
Preceded by Nelson Mandela	President of South Africa; 1999–2008	Succeeded by Kgalema Motlanthe (as President); Ivy Matsepe-Casaburri (as Acting President)
Diplomatic posts
Preceded by Nelson Mandela	Secretary General of Non-Aligned Movement; 1999–2003	Succeeded by Mahathir Mohamad
New title Created at 1999 CHOGM	Commonwealth Chairperson-in-Office; 1999–2002	Succeeded by John Howard
Preceded by Levy Mwanawasa	Chairperson of the African Union; 2002–2003	Succeeded by Joaquim Chissano
