= Epainette Mbeki =

Mother of former South African president Thabo Mbeki (1916-2014)

Epainette Mbeki SCOB
- Born: Nomaka Epainette Moerane; 16 February 1916; Mount Fletcher, Transkei
- Died: 7 June 2014 (aged 98); East London, Eastern Cape
- Known for: Anti apartheid and community activism
- Spouse: Govan Mbeki (m. 1940; died 2001)
- Children: Linda Mbeki (daughter; born 1941, died 2003); Thabo Mbeki (son; born 1942); Moeletsi Mbeki (son; born 1945); Jama Mbeki (son; born 1948, died 1982)
- Parents: Eleazar Jakane Moerane (father); Sofi Majara (mother)
- Relatives: Michael Mosoeu Moerane (brother)

Nomaka Epainette Mbeki (née Moerane; 16 February 1916 – 7 June 2014), commonly known as "MaMbeki", a stalwart community activist and promoter of women's development, mother of former President of South Africa, Thabo Mbeki. and widow of political activist and Rivonia trialist, Dr. Govan Mbeki. She lived in Ngcingwane, a rural hamlet near Dutywa, one of South Africa's poorest municipalities. She was known for her auspicious relatives and, more importantly to her, her endeavours to improve the residents' quality of life. Gillian Rennie, in an award-winning profile, quoted a co-worker as saying, "She is not like other retired people, getting a pension and saying, 'Let me play golf and fish a bit.' The old lady is a humble person."

== Life ==
She was a member of the Bafokeng, specifically the Mahoona clan – traditional healers who are one of the first agro-pastoralists to arrive in Lesotho. Born at Mount Fletcher in the Drakensberg, she grew up in humble environs, the sixth of seven children born to Eleazar Jakane Moerane and his wife Sofi Majara, whose grandparents were disciples of Moshoeshoe I and were among the first Basotho converts to Christianity. Her parents were African landowners and members of the Paris Evangelical Missionary Society Church. Most of their abundant arable land and livestock, however, had disappeared by the 1990s, owing largely to the apartheid government's Homelands policy. Early every morning before school, she would chase birds from her father's sorghum fields before returning after school for further bird-chasing. She was educated at Lovedale School before qualifying as a teacher at Adams College, Amanzimtoti near Durban.

== Community work ==
Mbeki was the brains behind the Khanyisa beadwork project, which has sustained the art of traditional African beadwork and provided livelihoods for 24 Ngcingwanean women. She was involved with the Linda Mbeki Hospice, which operates from the former Mbeki home in Mbewuleni, and was founded to commemorate the life of her daughter, who died in 2003. Mbeki also established the Nomaka Mbeki Technical Senior Secondary School and owned the Goodwill Trading Store, whose cash-counting and bookkeeping she did herself.

Sesotho-speaking and traditionalist, Mbeki placed great importance on education. Although it has been suggested, not least by Arnold Stofile (to whom Mbeki gave her religion), that she venture into politics, she has never been especially enamoured with the idea. "I wouldn't do as a member of parliament. You have to live with the people; you have to move among the people, to know their conditions [...]. Premier Makhenkesi says, 'I think you should belong to my government.' I say, 'No, that's not proper because, when I get there, I'll be as dull as you people.'" Her son, Thabo, attributed much of his political success to the wisdom of his mother, but she disagreed: "I wouldn't call it wisdom; it's an attitude, the attitude of self-last. He should forget about the ego and listen to the next man. That's really what he must do. I think he has managed; I think he has managed."

== Death and funeral ==
Mbeki died in East London at Frere Hospital in June 2014.

She was given a provincial state funeral and buried in Dutywa.

Her funeral was attended by Deputy President Cyril Ramaphosa, Eastern Cape Premier Phumulo Masualle, one of the Rivonia Trialists Dr. Andrew Mlangeni, Minister in the Presidency Jeff Radebe, Minister of Science and Technology Naledi Pandor, Minister of Defence and Military Veterans Nosiviwe Mapisa-Nqakula and her husband former Minister Charles Nqakula, Minister of Human Settlements, Water and Sanitation Lindiwe Sisulu, OR Tambo's son Dali Tambo, Brigalia Bam, Grace Machel, Winnie Mandela, IFP leader Mangosuthu Buthelezi, EFF leader Julius Malema, Xhosa King Zwelonke Sigcawu, abaThembu King Buyelekhaya Dalindyebo, Rev. Frank Chikane, Archbishop Njongonkulu Ndungane, Bishop Malusi Mpumlwana, Archbishop Thabo Makgoba, Bishop Mvume Dandala and other distinguished guests and prominent politicians.

President Jacob Zuma never attended due to the health situation but he announced that all flags in the province to be flown half-mast as from 7 June until the burial day.

== Awards and recognition ==
Mbeki won the Community Builder of the Year award (for which she had to go "all the way to Johannesburg"), a NAFCOC founder member award, a Transkei chamber stalwart award, the King Cetshwayo African Image Award, and the Eastern Cape arts and culture award for Khanyisa, given her by Arnold Stofile. She was also awarded the Order of the Baobab in 2006 for her "exceptional contribution to the economic upliftment of the underprivileged communities of the Eastern Cape and her commitment to the fight against apartheid." In 2012, she was awarded the degree of Doctor of Laws honoris causa by the Rhodes University.
