= Govan Mbeki =

South African politician (1910–2001)

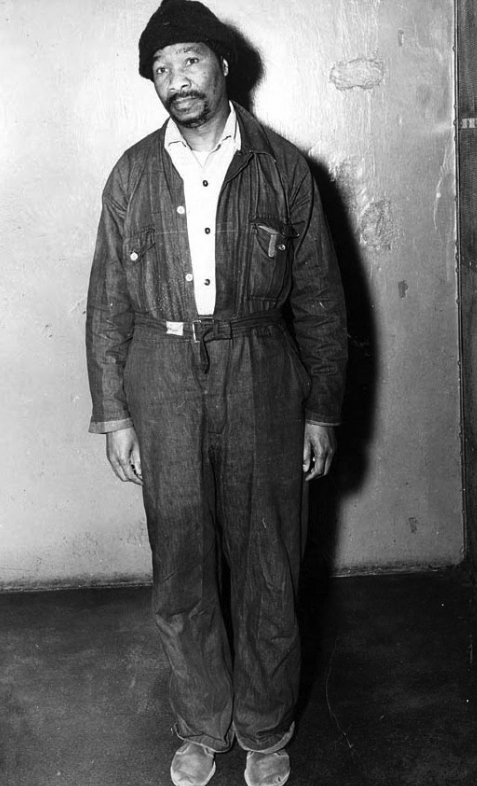
- Under arrest in 1963

Co-Deputy Chairperson of the National Council of Provinces
- In office 1997–1999 Serving with Bulelani Ngcuka
- Preceded by: position established
- Succeeded by: Naledi Pandor

Deputy President of the Senate of South Africa
- In office 1994–1997
- Preceded by: position established
- Succeeded by: position renamed

Secretary of MK
- In office 1961–1963
- Preceded by: position established
- Succeeded by: position abolished

Personal details
- Born: Govan Archibald Mvunyelwa Mbeki; 9 July 1910 Mpukane Location, Nqamakwe district, Union of South Africa
- Died: 30 August 2001 (aged 91) Port Elizabeth, Eastern Cape, Republic of South Africa
- Party: African National Congress; South African Communist Party
- Spouse: Epainette Mbeki (m. 1940)
- Children: Linda Mbeki (daughter; born 1941, died 2003); Thabo Mbeki (son; born 1942); Moeletsi Mbeki (son; born 1945); Jama Mbeki (son; born 1948, died 1982)
- Parents: Chief Skelewu Mbeki (father); Johanna Mabula (mother)
- Occupation: Anti-apartheid activist

Govan Archibald Mvunyelwa Mbeki (9 July 1910 – 30 August 2001) was a South African politician, military commander, Communist leader who served as the Secretary of Umkhonto we Sizwe, at its inception in 1961. He was also the younger son of Chief Skelewu Mbeki and Johanna Mabula and also the father of the former South African president Thabo Mbeki and political economist Moeletsi Mbeki.

Govan Mbeki was a leader of the South African Communist Party and the African National Congress. After the Rivonia Trial, he was imprisoned (1963–1987) on charges of terrorism and treason; together with Nelson Mandela, Walter Sisulu, Raymond Mhlaba, Ahmed Kathrada and other eminent ANC leaders, for their role in the ANC's armed wing, Umkhonto we Sizwe (MK). He was sometimes mentioned by his nickname "Oom Gov".

== Early years ==
Govan Mbeki was born in 1910 the Nqamakwe district of the Transkei region and was a part of the Xhosa ethnic group. Growing up, he attended a missionary boarding school. As a teenager, Mbeki worked as a newsboy and messenger in the cities, and because of this, he saw the poverty urban black Africans lived in, and the constant police raids they endured. He attended Fort Hare University, completing in 1936 a Bachelor of Arts degree in politics and psychology and a teaching diploma. Mbeki met other African struggle leaders while attending the university.

== Teacher, trader and communist ==
After graduating, Mbeki worked as a high school teacher in Durban, but lost his job because of his political activities. While teaching, he met his wife, Epainette Moerane. He was a member of the South African Communist Party (SACP, then the Communist Party of South Africa, or CPSA) from the late 1930s, and joined the African National Congress in 1935. He then set up a co-operative store in Idutywa and began a writing career. From 1938 to 1943, he was the editor of Inkundla Ya Bantu ("The People's Platform"), the only African-run newspaper at the time.

Mbeki left journalism in 1944 and became a government-nominated member of the Transkei Territorial Authorities General Council until 1950. His role in the CPSA/ SACP was clandestine at the time, which helps explain why he received the nomination. Mbeki disparagingly referred to the council as a "toy telephone": "You can say what you like, but your words have no effect because the wires are not connected to an exchange." In 1948 Mbeki stood as a candidate for the Natives Representative Council but lost the election.

When the CPSA/ SACP was banned in 1950 by the apartheid government, Mbeki remained in the African National Congress (ANC). In 1952, he was imprisoned together with Raymond Mhlaba and Vuyisile Mini for three months in Rooi Hel ('Red Hell' or North End Prison, Port Elizabeth) for disobeying apartheid laws by participating in the 'Campaign of Defiance against Injustice Laws' (Defiance Campaign). In 1954, a tornado destroyed Mbeki's store, and he was dismissed from teaching again (he would lose his job three times, and be blacklisted from others, from the 1930s onwards). Mbeki moved to Port Elizabeth and joined the editorial board of New Age, a prominent leftist newspaper linked to underground CPSA/ SACP networks. He played a crucial role in ensuring that the pages and columns reflected the conditions, demands, and aspirations of black working-class people, particularly in the countryside.

He also worked on the Guardian, New Age, Fighting Talk and Liberation, and worked with 'Jock' Harold Strachan in the Port Elizabeth area, and assisted him to produce the newsletter Izwi Lomzi ("Home Voice"). Mbeki was meanwhile actively involved in the major campaigns of the day, including the revival of the African National Congress in the 1940s, the Defiance Campaign and the Congress of the People.

== Armed struggle and Robben Island ==
In 1960, the ANC was banned, and along with the underground SACP, formed Umkhonto we Sizwe (MK), which became ANC's armed wing. Mbeki was involved, and, at his urging, Strachan assisted MK by turning his hand to improvised explosive devices based on substances such as potassium permanganate, magnesium, glycerol and icing sugar.

...this was our job – devices and explosives. So I said, for God’s sake, why me? And they said, no well, you were a bomber pilot in the war, you see, so you must know how to make bombs. I said, but for Christ’s sake, Govan, (Mbeki) we didn’t make our own bombs. And they said, but you know about those things and I said, no, bombs were made in bloody factories, I don’t know. So he said, anyway, you’re appointed. We did a good job, actually.

— Strachan, quoted by Zoe Mulder.

Mbeki led an MK cell in Port Elizabeth in 1961. In September 1962, he moved to Johannesburg, and then to Liliesleaf farm in Rivonia. Meanwhile, in November 1962, the then-Minister of Justice, John Vorster, banned New Age. When the editorial board came out with its successor publication, Spark, Vorster went one step further by banning not the newspaper but its editors and writers. This effectively ended Mbeki's role as editor and journalist in the country. On 11 July 1963, he was arrested with other MK high commanders at Liliesleaf farm. In 1964, he was an accused in the Rivonia Trial and sentenced to Robben Island. While in prison, he obtained an economics degree.

== Books ==
In 1938, Mbeki published his first book, Transkei in the Making. A supporter of the 1950–1961 Pondoland peasant revolt, he wrote the pioneering study of the movement, South Africa: The Peasants' Revolt from 1958, which was published in 1964. Much of the book is an analysis of the political economy of the Transkei, rather than the revolt itself. He began writing the book on rolls of toilet paper and had to smuggle it out of prison.

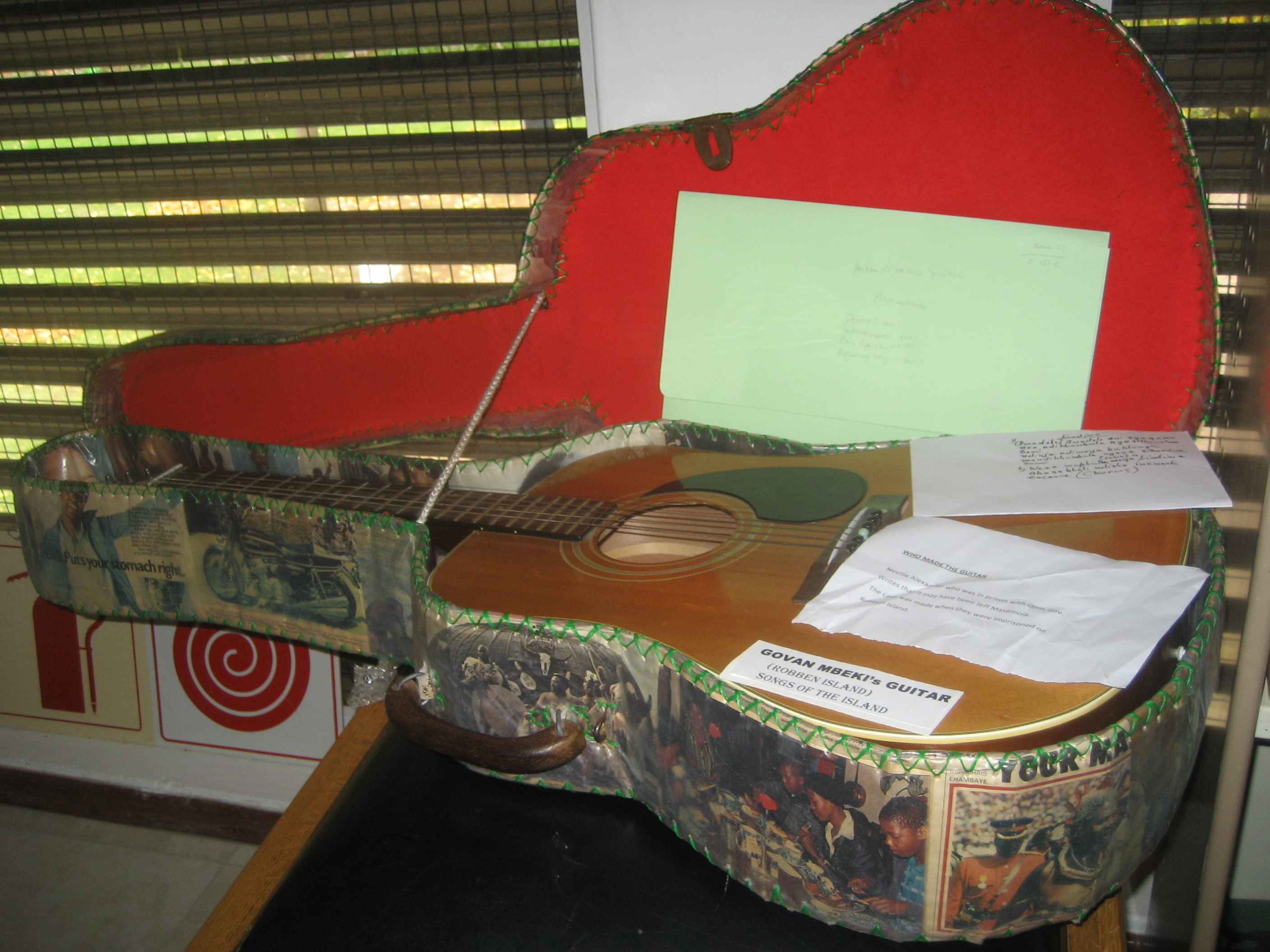
Govan Mbeki's guitar at Robben Island (Fort Hare Archives, 2016)

Following the Rivonia Trial, Mbeki served a long-term on Robben Island, during which he managed to run education classes with prisoners, many on Marxist theory, and wrote a number of significant analyses in jail, which were kept on the island and used for discussions. The surviving copies have since been published.

In 1992, he published The Struggle For Liberation in South Africa: A Short History and in 1996, Sunset at Midday: Latshonilangemini!

== Release and post-apartheid role ==
Mbeki was released from custody after serving 24 years in the Robben Island prison in November 1987. He served in South Africa's post-apartheid Senate from 1994 to 1997 as Deputy President of the Senate, and then the Senate's successor, the National Council of Provinces, from 1997 to 1999.

Mbeki died in Port Elizabeth on 30 August 2001. He was given a state funeral during his son Thabo Mbeki's presidency, on 8 September 2001.

Govan Mbeki's remains were the subject of controversy in 2006 when plans were made to exhume them, together with Raymond Mhlaba's remains, and place them in a museum. These plans were called off after both Mhlaba and Mbeki's family refused the request.

== Awards and honours ==
Mbeki received an honorary doctorate in the Social Sciences from the University of Amsterdam in 1978. His son Moeletsi attended the ceremony, as Mbeki was imprisoned at Robben Island.

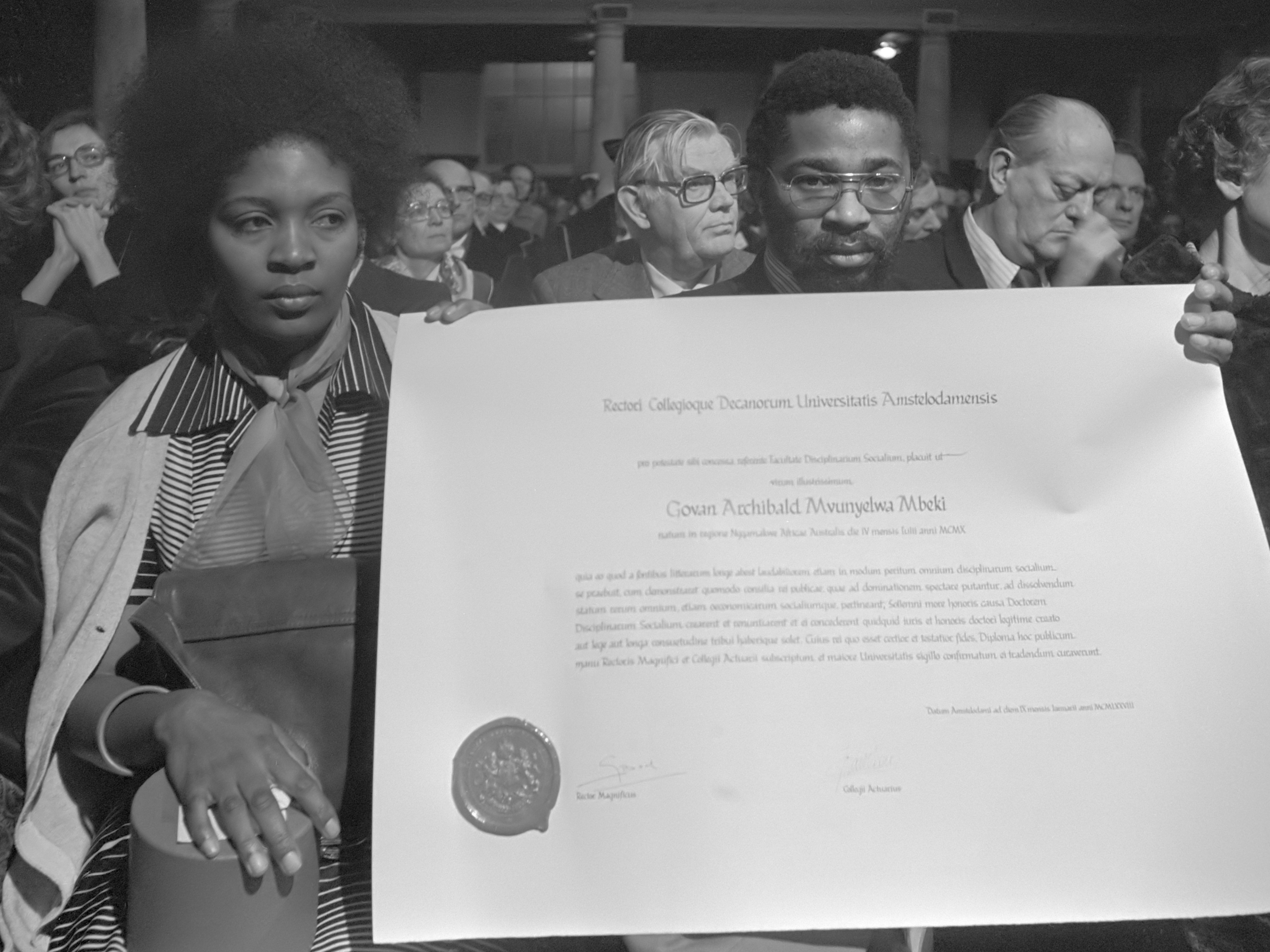
Honorary doctorate, Amsterdam 1978

On 26 June 1980, the Secretary General of the then-illegal African National Congress, Alfred Nzo, announced the conferring of the Isitwalandwe Medal, the ANC's highest honour, on Mbeki. However, he was not present to receive the award, because he was serving a life imprisonment sentence on Robben Island.

Mbeki received international recognition for his political achievements, including the renaming (at Mandela's suggestion) of the recently opened health building at Glasgow Caledonian University. The Govan Mbeki Health Building was inaugurated in 2001 at a ceremony featuring his son Thabo.

The Govan Mbeki Local Municipality in Mpumulanga is named in his honour.

Order for Meritorious Service in gold (2003).

In 2004, he was voted 97th in the SABC 3's Great South Africans.

In 2013, a large section of road between Swartklip and Baden Powell Road, running between the neighborhoods of Browns Farm, Gugulethu, Nyanga and Crossroads in Cape Town was renamed Govan Mbeki Road.

== See also ==
- Prisons in South Africa
- Maximum Security Prison, Robben Island
