= Mbewuleni =

- Location within Eastern Cape Location within South Africa
- Coordinates: 31.668°S 27.717°E
- Country: South Africa
- Province: Eastern Cape
- District: Chris Hani
- Municipality: Sakhisizwe

Government
  - Councillor: ū

Area
  - Total: 2.30 km^{2} (0.89 sq mi)

Population (2011)
  - Total: 233
  - Density: 101/km^{2} (262/sq mi)

Racial makeup (2011)
  - Black African: 99.6%
  - White: 0.4%

First languages (2011)
  - Xhosa: 98.3%
  - Other: 1.7%
- Time zone: UTC+2 (SAST)

Mbewuleni is a remote village in the Sakhisizwe Local Municipality of the Eastern Cape in South Africa. Its primary claim to fame is as the birthplace of former president Thabo Mbeki and the businessman Steven Wilson.
