= Sisulu =

Sisulu is a surname. Notable people with this surname include:

- Albertina Sisulu (1918–2011), anti–apartheid activist
- Beryl Rose Sisulu (born 1948), South African diplomat and lawyer, South African Ambassador to Mexico
- Lindiwe Sisulu (born 1954), South African Minister of Defence and Military Veterans
- Max Sisulu (born 1945), Speaker of the National Assembly of South Africa
- Mlungisi Sisulu (1948–2015), South African businessman
- Samuel Sisulu (1956–2003), South African anti-apartheid activist, Soweto uprising student leader and founder of South African Freedom Organisation (SAFO)
- Shaka Sisulu, South African social and political activist, entrepreneur and media personality.
- Walter Sisulu (1912–2003), Secretary-General of the African National Congress
- Zwelakhe Sisulu (1950–2012), South African journalist, editor, newspaper founder, CEO of SABC, and businessperson

== Fictional characters ==
- Thandi Sisulu, a fictional character in the Madam & Eve comic strip
