= John Perlman =

South African journalist

John Perlman is a radio presenter for 702 in South Africa, where he hosts The Drive Show, a weekday programme between 3 and 6 p.m. Perlman previously hosted "Today with John Perlman" on Kaya FM, and co-hosted AM Live and the After 8 Debate, the flagship morning news, current affairs and talk programmes on the SAfm radio station of the South African Broadcasting Corporation (SABC).

In his role at the SABC, Perlman was one of South Africa's most popular and respected radio anchors. The SABC described him as a "seasoned journalist and an outstanding broadcaster" and AM Live as "arguably the most influential programme in South Africa". However, in March 2007 Perlman resigned after blowing the whistle on political censorship within the SABC. His resignation was widely thought to indicate his dissatisfaction with internal politics at the SABC.

Perlman has a BA degree in history, African politics and Southern Sotho, and a BA Honours in development studies. He has also worked for the Weekly Mail, Saturday Star and Sunday Independent. He has also presented on television.

== Whistle-blowing on SABC blacklist ==
In 2006, Perlman caused a storm of controversy through an on-air whistle-blowing incident in which he revealed political censorship at the national broadcaster. In the live broadcast, Perlman contradicted SABC spokesperson Kaizer Kganyago's denial that the SABC had an editorial blacklist of commentators critical of the South African government or president. He later said that this followed intensive internal discussions over three months with concerned SABC staffers, and that others had also taken a stand.

An internal SABC commission of inquiry was appointed, headed by Zwelakhe Sisulu and Gilbert Marcus, to investigate the allegations, and in October 2006 issued a damning report against the SABC. The report entirely vindicated Perlman's statement, finding that there was an arbitrary blacklist of commentators who SABC staff were instructed not to consult. This blacklist included prominent analysts Karima Brown, Aubrey Matshiqi, William Gumede, Paula Slier, Sipho Seepe, Moeletsi Mbeki, Elinor Sisulu, and Trevor Ncube. The commissioners sharply criticised the head of SABC News, Snuki Zikalala, for his management style, and said that there was a climate of fear in the SABC newsroom. It found that the blacklisting contradicted the SABC's mandate and recommended that new guidelines on commentators be developed through wide consultation in and outside the SABC.

Despite the commissioners' strong recommendations that their report be released to the public, the SABC CEO Dali Mpofu chose not to publish it, initially releasing only excerpts, and then unsuccessfully attempting a court interdict against the Mail & Guardian when they published the full report online. Mpofu's actions were widely criticised at the time.

Following the report, the SABC threatened Perlman with disciplinary action for "bringing the organisation into disrepute" but took no action on the commission's findings against Zikalala or the SABC. Perlman reportedly refused to accept an on-air warning for contradicting Kganyago, insisting on a disciplinary hearing instead.

== Resignation ==
On 30 January 2007, Perlman announced his resignation from the SABC after nine years, and held his last show on 2 March. Although initially Perlman did not comment on his reasons, the media reported that his resignation was linked to his dissatisfaction with the SABC's failure to respond to the commission's report.

Perlman's resignation announcement came at the same time as his co-host Nikiwe Bikitsha's departure from the SABC to take up a post with CNBC Africa. The Mail & Guardian reported on 3 February that the final straw for Perlman was that the station bosses excluded him from discussions about Bikitsha's successor, although he had always previously been included in decisions on who would be his co-anchor. It also reported that Perlman was offered a post at the CNBC Africa business channel, but had not accepted it. The Star pointed to several other prominent resignations, speculating that this indicated a purge of news staff who had appeared before the commission and given evidence criticising the blacklisting policy. It also pointed to a June 2005 staff exodus, which was suspected as being a purge of people opposed to Zikalala's political views.

=== Reaction ===
Perlman's departure and the lack of action against Zikalala was condemned by media commentators and political parties from COSATU to the Democratic Alliance as a worrying development for media freedom in South Africa.

On Perlman's first After 8 Debate call-in show after his upcoming departure became public, a discussion of the SA film industry began with a caller referring to the "horror movie" of John Perlman's departure. Others said that SABC management should be ashamed of themselves and wondered if Perlman's successor would have the courage to host a call-in programme investigating the reasons for Perlman's departure, with Perlman responding that this was "not likely".

The Freedom of Expression Institute (FXI) marched to the SABC headquarters on 6 February to demand greater transparency and accountability, saying that Perlman's resignation and others pointed to victimisation at the SABC, and laid a formal complaint with the Independent Communications Authority of South Africa (ICASA).

The Media Monitoring Project included Perlman's reinstatement in its wishlist for Thabo Mbeki's state of the nation address on 9 February. Interviewed by Perlman on 22 February following the annual budget speech, Finance Minister Trevor Manuel praised Perlman's "sterling work" and contribution to changing the face of the SA media.

COSATU took out a full-page advert in the Mail & Guardian on 2 March, coinciding with Perlman's last day on air, paying tribute to him as "an excellent and patriotic journalist". Perlman's final After 8 Debate was titled "Have we learnt anything from the After 8 Debate?"

Perlman was replaced by fellow SAFM presenters, Jeremy Maggs and Tsepiso Makwetla. Maggs has subsequently left Safm to join E-sat South Africa's 24-hour news channel and has been replaced by Tim Modise.
