= Karima Brown =

South African journalist (1967–2021)

- Brown in an undated photo
- Born: 1967; Cape Town, Cape Province, South Africa
- Died: 4 March 2021 (aged 54); Johannesburg, Gauteng, South Africa
- Education: Salt River High School; University of the Western Cape
- Occupations: Journalist; television presenter; radio personality; political analyst; anti-apartheid activist
- Political party: African National Congress
- Children: Mikhail Brown (son)

Karima Brown (1967 – 4 March 2021) was a South African journalist. She worked in a variety of positions, being the political editor for national daily newspaper Business Day and launching Forbes Women Africa. She was also known for a court case she took against the Economic Freedom Fighters.

== Early life and education ==
Born in Cape Town and educated at Salt River High School, Brown was the daughter of Achmat Semaar, a community leader in Mitchell's Plain and an ANC activist. She followed him into political activism joining the Cape Youth Congress and the South African Students Congress while studying at the University of the Western Cape. She was later a member of the United Democratic Front.

== Career ==
During her career as a respected South African journalist, she served as Business Day's political editor, presented the Karima Brown show on Radio 702, was group executive editor at Independent Newspapers and launched Forbes Women Africa. Shortly prior to her death, she hosted a current affairs show on eNCA called The Fix.

As a member of the ANC, as well as a journalist, she occasionally attracted controversy. In October 2006, an internal commission at the SABC agreed with veteran journalist John Perlman that the broadcasting corporation had an arbitrary blacklist of political commentators. The commission of inquiry, headed by Zwelakhe Sisulu and Gilbert Marcus, found that Brown had been blacklisted alongside Aubrey Matshiqi, William Gumede, Paula Slier, Sipho Seepe, Moeletsi Mbeki, Elinor Sisulu, and Trevor Ncube.

In 2019, Brown won a court case against the Economic Freedom Fighters, suing after she received threatening messages when Julius Malema published her cellphone number on social media. The Johannesburg High Court found that the party contravened the electoral code and Brown welcomed the ruling as a “victory for media freedom, a victory against sexism, and [a] victory for women in journalism and protection and freedom of the media”.

== Death ==
Brown died from COVID-19 on 4 March 2021, at the age of 54, during the COVID-19 pandemic in South Africa. She was buried on the same day according to Islamic religion. The South African government paid tribute to her saying that "her contribution to the journalistic profession and fearlessness in carrying out her job will sorely be missed."
