= Michael Stern (educator) =

- Born: Michael Alexander Stern; 13 January 1922; Egypt
- Died: 14 July 2002 (aged 80); Hindhead, Surrey, England
- Education: Downing College, Cambridge
- Occupation: Educator
- Known for: Founding of Waterford Kamhlaba United World College
- Spouse: Sarah Roberts (m. 1986–1987)
- Children: 1 daughter, 1 stepson

Michael Alexander Stern OBE (13 January 1922 – 14 July 2002) was the founder of the Waterford Kamhlaba United World College, a multi-racial school in opposition to South Africa's apartheid policies.

== Early life and career ==
Michael Alexander Stern was born on 13 January 1922 in Egypt, the son of a civil engineer. He attended Ravenswood Preparatory School in Devon and Gresham's School in Holt, Norfolk.

Stern went to Downing College, Cambridge for a year before his studies were interrupted by World War II. Stern served in the Royal Signals in the British Army in North Africa, Italy, and Greece, rising to the rank of captain. He graduated from Downing College in 1947.

Stern taught at school in England, later assuming head teaching posts at approved schools from 1952 to 1955. In 1955, Stern read an article by the Revd Trevor Huddleston and, at Huddleston's invitation, Stern went to South Africa and became the headmaster of St Peter's, a school for African children in Johannesburg. However, educational policies under the apartheid government in South Africa forced the school to close. Stern was then appointed as the headmaster of the new (white) school which took its place, St. Martin's School, Rosettenville, by the bishop of Johannesburg, Ambrose Reeves. He stayed for five years.

== Waterford School ==
Stern left South Africa for Swaziland to establish a new school in which students of all races could study together, with an emphasis on cooperation in community service. As a result of his efforts, Waterford School was born in 1963.

Stern and his school became famous across southern Africa. Nelson Mandela, still in prison, sent his daughters there. Desmond Tutu sent his children. Seretse Khama, the leader of Botswana, sent his son Ian, who would later become President of Botswana. The Tutu and Sisulu families also sent their children. Another Waterford boy, Fernando Honwana, became a trusted assistant to Samora Machel of Mozambique, helping him to act as go-between in negotiations between Margaret Thatcher's administration and the emerging African government in Rhodesia, later Zimbabwe. Stern's educational accomplishment was based on the school's balance of boys (and later girls) of all races, tribes and religions.

In November 1995, Nelson Mandela presented Stern with a Founder’s Medal, saying in his speech that Stern's time at Waterford "demonstrated in the worst days of apartheid, that even those who were free to enjoy the privileges of the system could ally themselves with the oppressed in the interest of non-racialism in Southern Africa."

Stern was appointed OBE in 1968, and in 1999 he was awarded an honorary doctorate by Sussex University.

== Later life ==
Stern returned to England in 1973 and served as superintendent for children's homes until 1980. He then served as director of the charity Mind from 1980 to 1983.

In 1986, Stern married Sarah Roberts, who had a son, Hugh, by a previous marriage. They had a daughter, Miranda. Sarah died in 1987, and Michael Stern focused on raising the children himself.

Michael Stern died in a car accident in Hindhead, Surrey on 14 July 2002, aged 80.
