= List of high commissioners of South Africa to Australia =

High Commissioner of South Africa to Australia
- Incumbent; Marthinus van Schalkwyk since 1 March 2017
- Style: His Excellency
- Appointer: Cyril Ramaphosa
- Inaugural holder: Dr Philip Rudolph Viljoen
- Formation: February 1949
- Website: South African High Commission, Canberra

The high commissioner of South Africa to Australia is an officer of the South African Department of International Relations and Cooperation and the head of the High Commission of the Republic of South Africa to the Commonwealth of Australia. The position has the rank and status of an ambassador extraordinary and plenipotentiary and holds non-resident accreditation as Ambassador to the Marshall Islands and the Federated States of Micronesia. The high commissioner is based with the High Commission in Yarralumla in Canberra.

The high commissioner is currently Beryl Sisulu, a career diplomat, and South Africa and Australia have enjoyed diplomatic relations since 1949. On South Africa's departure from the Commonwealth of Nations in 1961, the High Commission became an Embassy. Following the end of Apartheid and South Africa's return to the Commonwealth on 1 June 1994, the High Commission was re-established to replace the former Embassy.

== Office-holders ==
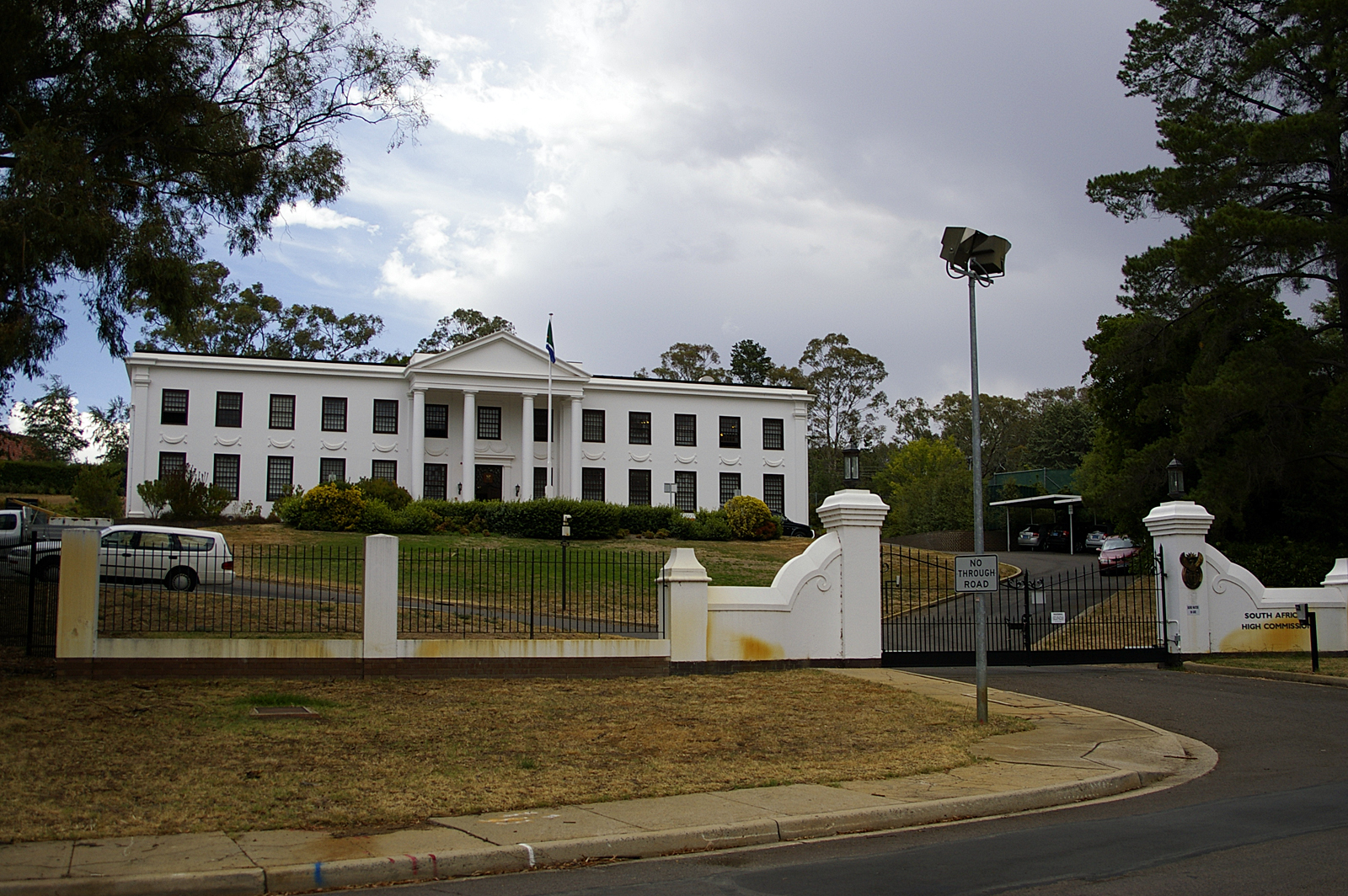
The South African High Commission in Yarralumla, Canberra.

=== High commissioners from the Union of South Africa, 1949–61 ===
Incumbent	Start of term	End of term
Dr. Philip Rudolph Viljoen	February 1949	14 November 1951
G. C. Neil (acting)	15 November 1951	20 February 1954
Johann Kunz Uys	21 February 1954	10 June 1957
Anthony M. Hamilton	10 September 1957	27 March 1961

=== Ambassadors from the Republic of South Africa, 1961–94 ===
Incumbent	Start of term	End of term
Herbert Hans Woodward	31 May 1961	8 October 1964 - also served as the last High Commissioner from the Union of South Africa from 8 April to 30 May 1961.
Johan Christiaan Holm Maree	24 June 1965	14 January 1969
Johann Kunz Uys	3 February 1969	1971
John Brent Mills	1971	1977
Alan John Oxley	1977	1983
Denis Worrall	1983	1984
Cornelius A. Bastiaanse	13 August 1984	1988
Francis David Tothill	1988	1992
Naudé Steyn	8 September 1992	1 June 1994

=== High commissioners from the Republic of South Africa, 1994 to date ===
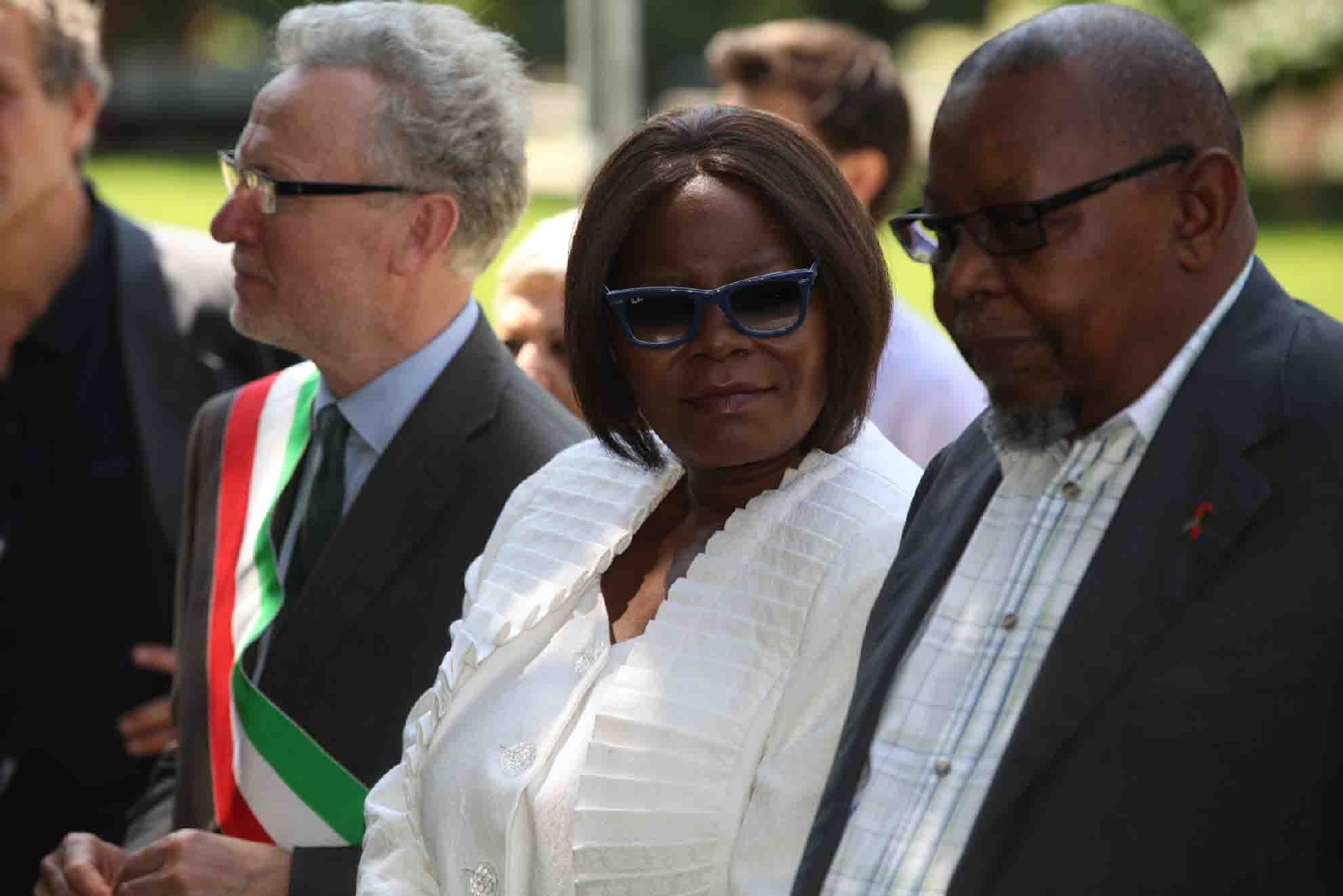
High Commissioner Anthony Mongalo (right) in June 2013.

Incumbent	Start of term	End of term
Naudé Steyn	1 June 1994	1996
Bhadra Ranchod	June 1996	2003
Anthony Mongalo	2003	2009
Lenin Magigwane Shope	26 February 2009	2010
Mauritz C. Lindeque	21 November 2010	2011
Koleka Anita Mqulwana	17 February 2011	2015
S'bu Ndebele	13 May 2015	February 2017
Beryl Sisulu	1 March 2017	14 April 2019
Marthinus van Schalkwyk	15 April 2019	

== See also ==
- Australia–South Africa relations
- Foreign relations of South Africa
- List of high commissioners of Australia to South Africa
