= African National Congress Veterans' League =

Political party in South Africa

- Abbreviation: ANCVL
- President: Snuki Zikalala
- Secretary-General: Ilva Mackay-Langa
- Founded: December 2009
- Headquarters: Luthuli House; 54 Sauer Street; Johannesburg; Gauteng

The African National Congress Veterans' League (ANCVL) is an auxiliary political organisation of the African National Congress (ANC) of South Africa. Its members are ANC veterans, defined as people aged 60 or older who have belonged to the ANC for at least 40 years. The league was founded in December 2009 to represent veterans in the decision-making of the mainstream ANC. Since October 2017, its president has been Snuki Zikalala; Nelson Mandela was its honorary life president.

== History and structure ==
The Veterans' League was founded in 2009 and held its inaugural national conference in early December 2009 in Esselen Park, Western Cape. It is one of three leagues recognised in the ANC constitution, the others being the Women's League and the Youth League. Like the other leagues, it functions as an "autonomous body" within, and "integral part" of, the overall ANC; it is permitted to formulate its own rules and constitution (adopted in December 2009), to establish local and provincial branches, and to vote (through delegates) at the ANC's national conferences.

The league defines veterans – those eligible to apply for membership to the body – as ANC members aged 60 or older, who have "served the ANC and the movement over an unbroken period of [at least] 40 years". Its formal objective is to ensure that these veterans "make a full and rich contribution to the work of the ANC, to the movement and to the life of the nation". Its foundation was viewed as continuous with a tradition, both within the ANC and within South African culture generally, of granting a special status and authority to elders.

== Leadership ==
The league's first national elective conference, held in December 2009, elected the following veterans to top positions in the national leadership:

- President: Sandi Sijake
- Deputy President: Thandi Memela
- Secretary General: Natso Khumalo
- Deputy Secretary General: Mochubela "Wesi" Seeko
- Treasurer: Fanele Mbali Herbert

Former ANC president Nelson Mandela was the honorary life president of the league, in line with a special resolution taken by the inaugural conference.

Its second national conference, held in October 2017 in Ekurhuleni, Gauteng, elected the following leaders:

- President: Snuki Zikalala
- Deputy President: Bonisile Philemon Norushe
- Secretary General: Natso Khumalo
- Deputy Secretary General: Evelyn Lubidla
- Treasurer: Gabriel Moosa

The league held its third national conference, from 28 to 30 July 2023 in Boksburg, Gauteng, and the following veterans were elected to top positions in the national leadership:

- President: Snuki Zikalala
- Deputy President: Mavuso Msimang
- Secretary-General: Ilva Mackay-Langa
- Deputy Secretary-General: Connie September
- Treasurer-General: Fazel Randera

== Relationship to ANC leadership ==
During the presidency of Jacob Zuma, the Veterans' League had an acrimonious relationship with the national leadership of the mainstream ANC, which was also headed by Zuma. Many of the veterans, including league president Sijake, were among those who criticised Zuma during the Nkandlagate scandal and thereafter. This critical posture was maintained under Sijake's successor, Zikalala, and contrasted notedly with the posture of the pro-Zuma Umkhonto weSizwe Military Veterans' Association (MKMVA), a competing veterans' organisation affiliated with the ANC. Ahead of the 54th National Conference of the ANC, the Veterans' League backed Cyril Ramaphosa's candidacy for the ANC presidency, against Zuma's preferred successor, Nkosazana Dlamini-Zuma. In December 2017, Zuma opened the 54th Conference with a political report that was highly critical of the league, calling the veterans "so-called leaders" and saying that he looked forward to joining the league himself and encouraging it to play a more constructive role. Zikalala said that Zuma would have to apply to join the league, but that the league would welcome his membership, his comments notwithstanding.

The 54th Conference elected Ramaphosa as ANC president, and, in March 2018, Ramaphosa met with representatives of the Veterans' League and other ANC stalwarts. According to Zikalala, during the meeting, Ramaphosa expressed regret over the veterans' mistreatment by Zuma and began to establish a warmer relationship between the ANC leadership and the veterans. In later years (and in contrast to MKMVA), the league under Zikalala continued to defend Ramaphosa against Zuma. It also argued publicly that Zuma should appear before the Zondo Commission, to answer allegations of corruption, and then that Zuma should face criminal liability for his refusal to appear. In November 2022, ahead of the ANC's 55th National Conference, the league endorsed Ramaphosa for a second term as ANC president.

== See also ==
- Robben Island
- Internal resistance to apartheid
- History of the African National Congress
- 52nd National Conference of the African National Congress
