= Who Wants to Be a Millionaire? (South African game show) =

- Created by: David Briggs; Mike Whitehill; Steven Knight
- Presented by: Jeremy Maggs
- Country of origin: South Africa
- Original language: English

Production
- Running time: 60 minutes including commercials
- Production company: Videovision Entertainment

Original release
- Network: M-Net, SABC 3
- Release: 7 November 1999 – 2005

Who Wants to Be a Millionaire? was a South African game show hosted by Jeremy Maggs and based on the original British format of Who Wants to Be a Millionaire?. The goal of the game was to win one 1,000,000rands by answering fifteen multiple choice questions correctly. Who Wants to Be a Millionaire? was shown on the M-Net, which also used their logo in the programme's logo. The program was shown on Wednesdays and Sundays. Six series of the show were made. There was a project to make another version of the quiz show in Afrikaans, which launched on 27 October 2021 as Wie Word 'n Miljoenêr? airing on KykNET.

== Payout structure ==
| Question number | Question value |
| Question number | (Yellow zones are the guaranteed levels) |
|---|---|
| 1 | R100 |
| 2 | R200 |
| 3 | R300 |
| 4 | R500 |
| 5 | R1,000 |
| 6 | R2,000 |
| 7 | R4,000 |
| 8 | R8,000 |
| 9 | R16,000 |
| 10 | R32,000 |
| 11 | R64,000 |
| 12 | R125,000 |
| 13 | R250,000 |
| 14 | R500,000 |
| 15 | R1,000,000 |

== Top prize winners ==
David Paterson was the only million rand winner, on 19 March 2000. He was the first winner outside the United States.

Paterson's one million rand question

R1,000,000 (15 of 15) – no time limit

Which famous musical star was known as Baby Frances Gumm early in her career?

1. Ginger Rogers
2. Deanna Durbin
3. Doris Day
4. Judy Garland(correct answer)
