= Shaka Sisulu =

South African media personality and activist

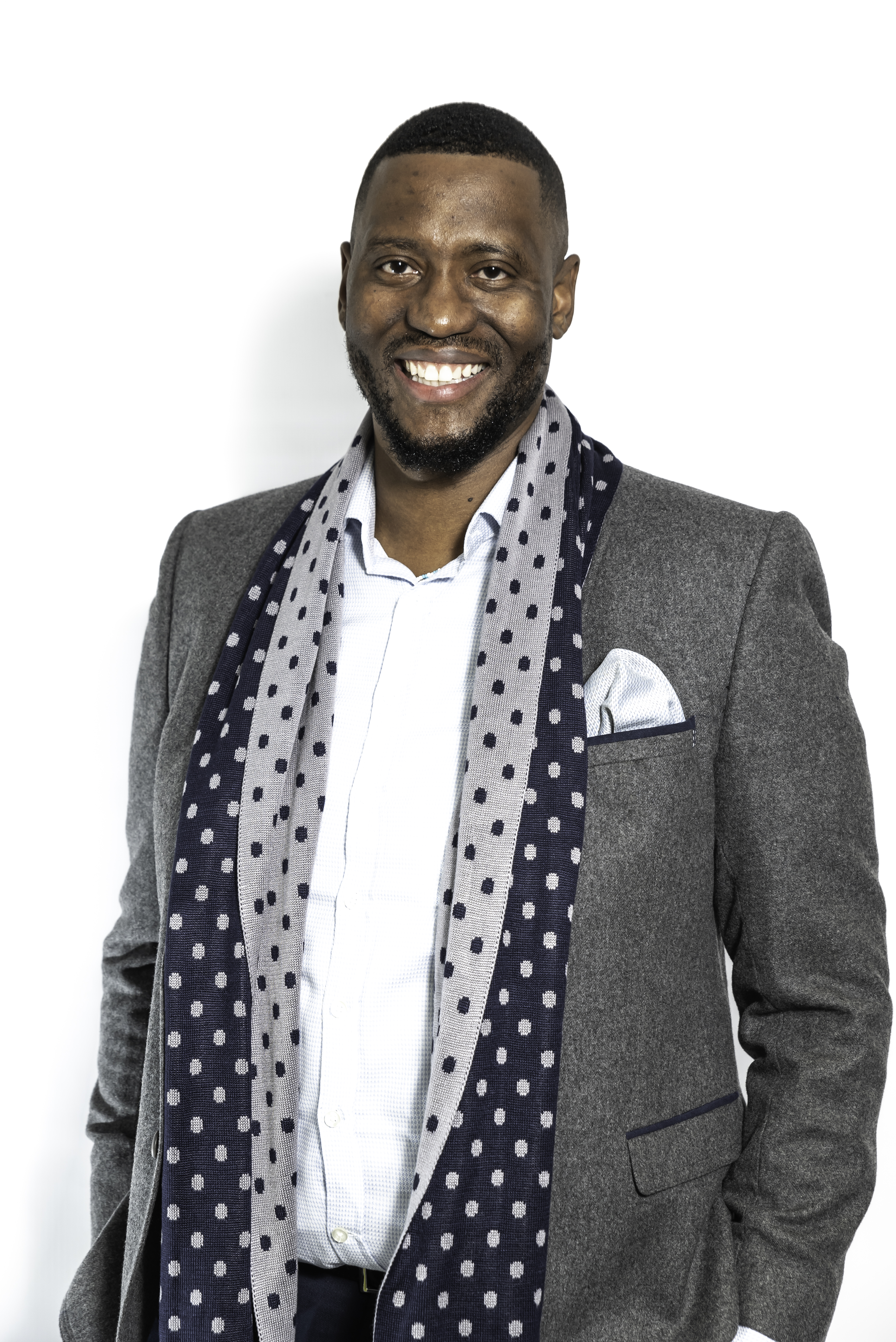
- Born: Apr 25 1979; Leipzig, Germany
- Education: Gordon Institute of Business Science
- Occupations: Media personality, entrepreneur, social and political activist
- Relatives: Max Sisulu (father); Elinor Sisulu (step-mother)
- Website: shakasisulu.africa

Shaka Sisulu is a South African social and political activist, entrepreneur and media personality.

== Career ==
Shaka Sisulu has co-founded and worked in various media and IT ventures, including the telecommunications wing of $300m ITEC group. In 2006, he co-founded Cheesekids for Humanity, popularly known as Cheesekids, a 20,000 strong volunteer movement. In conjunction with his alma mater, Gordon's Institute of Business Science (GIBS), Shaka co-hosted and facilitated a number of dialogue circles - A Conversation with Kgalema Mothlanthe (2008), Undecided Voters Forum (2009), The Dinner Club (2010), Qiniso (2011) - that brought together youth of highly diverse backgrounds and political persuasions with a view to build- ing bridges for the future. He has given talks on business, and entrepreneurship at Levis’ Pioneer Nation, Awethu Incubator and THUD Joburg. Between 2009 and 2011 Shaka served as a founding trustee of the Foundation for a Safe South Africa. Shaka served on the board of Lovelife for 6 years from 2010. Lovelife has been South Africa's most successful and longest-running teen HIV/AIDS prevention organization. In 2015, following outbreaks of xenophobic attacks across South Africa, Shaka and fellow social commentator Khaya Dlanga led the Peace Bus initiative to spread goodwill between South Africans and foreigners, particularly from the continent.

Shaka Sisulu has embarked on two Kilimanjaro expeditions for charitable causes, in 2012 and 2015. Since the 2014 Israel-Gaza Conflict, Shaka has been an outspoken campaigner for the rights of the Palestinian people, denouncing the war, and advocating for Israel's withdrawal from the Occupied Territories.

Shaka has served in various political structures of the African National Congress (ANC) including an appointment to the interim ANC Youth League leadership (National Task Team) following its disbandment in 2013. He has also served on the ANC's Communications Sub-Committee and on policy teams at the 2015 ANC National General Council, and serves on the sub-committee for communications in Gauteng province.

Shaka Sisulu co-Founded #RacismMustFall in 2016 following a number of racist outbursts on social media, with the intent to leverage the law of the country and the constitution to litigate against racist public talk. Shaka published his first book “Becoming” in 2012 as part of Pan Mac- Millan's “The Youngsters” series, which featured 6 popular South African youth figures. In 2015, he narrated and featured in a documentary, Tribute to the Front-line States, which examined the role of South Africa's neighbours in the fight against Apartheid. In 2016 Shaka received a Mahatma Gandhi Satyagraha Award for his contribution to youth development in South Africa. In his childhood Shaka was a pioneer representative to Angola and Congo, Brazzaville for the ANC's pioneer organization - Masupatsela a Walter Sisulu. This organization would in 2016 become very vocal about the state of the ANC today. Shaka is currently executive Chair at both Plum Factory and Retroviral, two digital agencies that count brands such as Multichoice, Hollard, Russell Hobbs, Nedbank, RoccoMamas, Viacom amongst their respective clients. These agencies are part of a Digital Marketing and Technology Services Group that Sisulu is developing.

Shaka has cameoed as a judge for two seasons of youth development TV show; One Day Leader; and as a mentor for youth development TV show, Future Leaders on South Africa's largest TV station.

Shaka was until recently part of a weekly commentary panel show, Trending SA on the national broadcaster SABC 3 with a daily viewership exceeding 500,000.
