= Wie Word 'n Miljoenêr? =

South African game show

- Genre: Quiz show
- Based on: Who Wants to Be a Millionaire?
- Presented by: Rian van Heerden
- Composers: Keith Strachan; Matthew Strachan; Ramon Covalo; Nick Magnus
- Country of origin: South Africa
- Original language: Afrikaans
- No. of seasons: 3
- No. of episodes: 52

Original release
- Network: kykNET
- Release: 27 October 2021 – present

Wie Word 'n Miljoenêr? is the second South African version of Who Wants to Be a Millionaire?. It is broadcast on kykNET in the Afrikaans language. It is hosted by Rian van Heerden. The top prize is R1,000,000.

== Rules ==
=== Fastest Finger First ===
In this version's FFF (Fastest Finger First), 6 contestants appear.

== Lifelines ==
- Ask The Audience (Oor na die gehoor)
- 50:50 (Vyftig vyftig)
- Phone-A-Friend (Bel 'n pêl)
- Ask The Host (Vra die aanbleder) (2023–)

== Money Tree ==
Payout structure
| Question number | Question value | |
| Question number | 2021–2022 | 2023–present |
|---|---|---|
| 15 | R1 000 000 | |
| 14 | R500 000 | R500 000 |
| 13 | R250 000 | R250 000 |
| 12 | R125 000 | R125 000 |
| 11 | R65 000 | R70 000 |
| 10 | R40 000 | R50 000 |
| 9 | R30 000 | R30 000 |
| 8 | R25 000 | R25 000 |
| 7 | R20 000 | R20 000 |
| 6 | R15 000 | R15 000 |
| 5 | R10 000 | |
| 4 | R6 000 | |
| 3 | R3 000 | |
| 2 | R2 000 | |
| 1 | R1 000 | |
Milestone Custom milestone Top prize

== Winners ==
=== Millionaires ===
- Herman Bosman (20 November 2024)

=== R500,000 winners ===
- Theunis Strydom (23 March 2022)
- Susan Booyens (6 July 2023)

== See also ==
- Who Wants to Be a Millionaire? (English version of South Africa)
