= Waverley Girls' High School =

Location
- Athol Street; Waverley, Johannesburg, Gauteng; South Africa; 26°8′25″S 28°4′48″E

Information
- Type: Public high school
- Motto: Quantum In Nobis (Latin for Within Us Is Great Potential)
- Established: 1951
- Headmaster: Mr M M Seopa (2014)
- Grades: 8–12
- Gender: Female
- Colours: Blue and white/Red, grey and white

Waverley Girls' High School is a public school for girls located in the suburb of Waverley in Johannesburg, South Africa.

== History ==
=== Early history ===
Plans for building the school started back in 1952, and the school was completed in 1953. It finally opened in 1955.

== Alumni ==
- Paula Slier, television, radio and print journalist, news editor, and war correspondent.
