= Paula Slier =

South African journalist

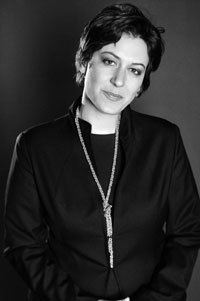
- Born: 26 March; Johannesburg, Transvaal, South Africa
- Education: Waverley Girls' High School
- Alma mater: University of Witwatersrand
- Occupation: Journalist

Paula Slier (born 26 March, 1973) is a South African television, radio and print journalist, news editor, and war correspondent, who is based in the Middle East. She served as the Middle East Bureau Chief for RT, and is the founder and CEO of Newshound Media International.

== Early life and family ==
Slier was born in Johannesburg, South Africa, and is the eldest of three, having both a younger brother and sister. She attended Waverley Girls' High School, following which she enrolled at the University of Witwatersrand, graduating with a degree in international relations and philosophy.

== Career ==
Slier began her career in journalism as a producer, senior reporter, and anchorwoman for The Breakfast Club morning show at the South African Broadcasting Corporation.

In 2005, she was appointed as the Middle East Bureau Chief for RT. As a freelance news reporter in the Middle East she contributed reports to Eyewitness News, Carte Blanche, and Reuters Africa.

In 2006, SABC news head, Snuki Zikalala, ordered an outright ban on reports from Slier because "she was critical of South African President Thabo Mbeki", and "as Slier is Jewish she supports Israel".

In 2008, Slier founded Newshound Media International, a news content production company.
