= Max Sisulu =

South African politician (born 1945)

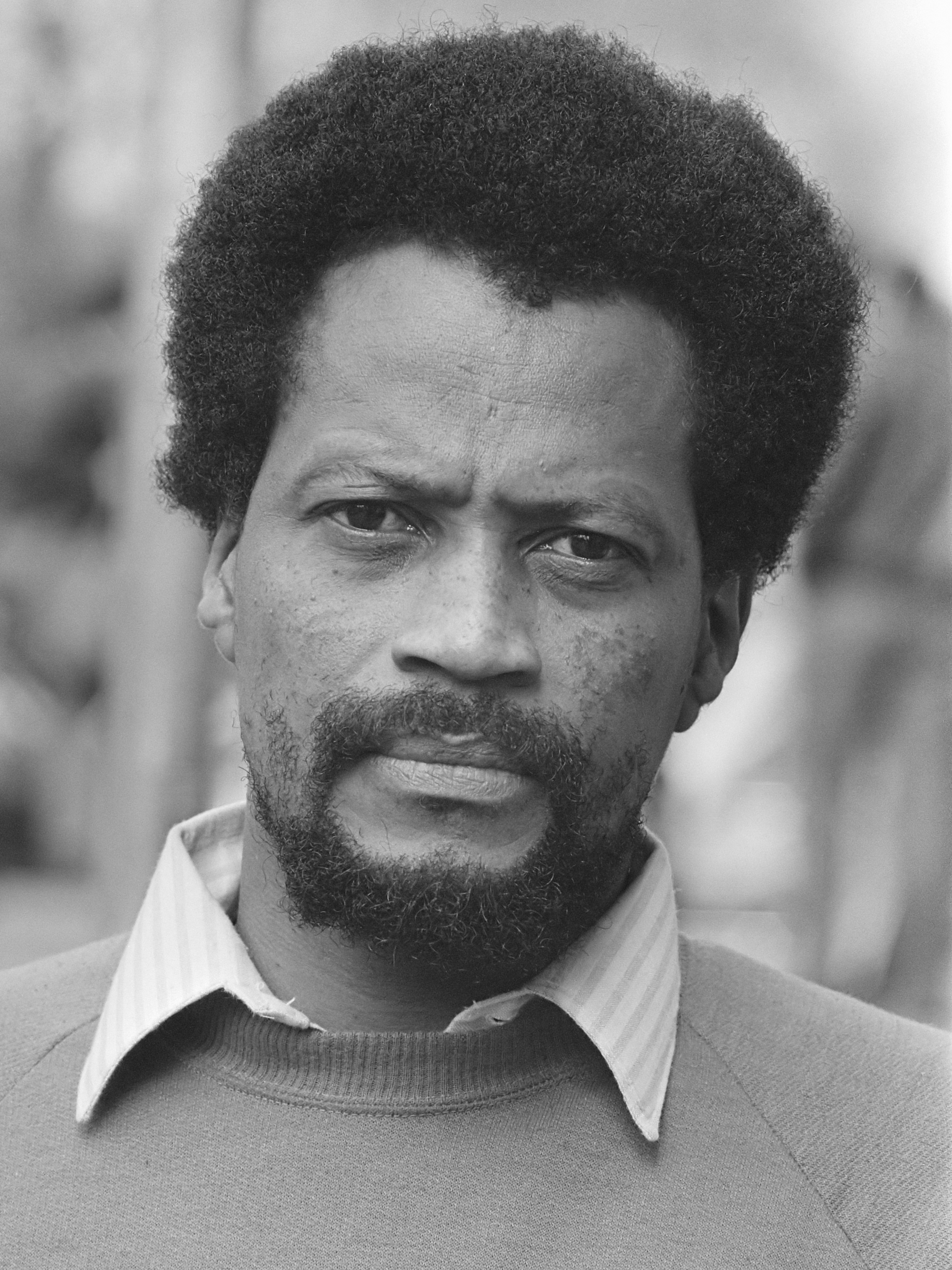
- Sisulu in 1985

4th Speaker of the National Assembly of South Africa
- In office 6 May 2009 – 21 May 2014
- President: Jacob Zuma
- Deputy: Nomaindia Mfeketo
- Preceded by: Gwen Mahlangu-Nkabinde
- Succeeded by: Baleka Mbete

Chief Whip of the Majority Party
- In office February 1997 – November 1998
- Preceded by: Makhenkesi Stofile
- Succeeded by: Tony Yengeni

Member of the National Assembly
- In office 6 May 2009 – 29 May 2014
- In office 26 April 1994 – November 1998

Personal details
- Born: Max Vuyisile Sisulu; 23 August 1945 (age 80) Soweto, Transvaal; Union of South Africa
- Party: African National Congress
- Spouse(s): Mercy Vutela (m. 1966; div. 1967) Elinor Sisulu (m. 1986)
- Relations: Zwelakhe Sisulu (brother); Lindiwe Sisulu (sister); Mlungisi Sisulu (brother)
- Children: 5, including Shaka
- Parents: Walter; Albertina

Max Vuyisile Sisulu (born 23 August 1945) is a South African politician and businessman who was Speaker of the National Assembly from May 2009 to May 2014. A member of the African National Congress (ANC), he was a member of the party's National Executive Committee from December 1994 to December 2017.

Born in Soweto, Sisulu is the son of anti-apartheid activists Albertina and Walter Sisulu. Between 1963 and 1990, at the height of apartheid, he lived outside of South Africa with the exiled ANC and its military wing, Umkhonto we Sizwe. An economist by training, he was the ANC's head of economic planning from 1986 to 1990, and he remained influential in ANC economic policymaking in subsequent decades.

In April 1994, in South Africa's first democratic elections, Sisulu was elected to represent the ANC in the National Assembly, the lower house of the new South African Parliament. For much of the First Parliament, he was the chairperson of the Portfolio Committee on the Reconstruction and Development Programme (RDP). Then, from February 1997 to November 1998, he served as Chief Whip of the Majority Party. However, he resigned from his seat in November 1998 to work in business, first at Denel and later at Sasol.

He did not return to Parliament until the April 2009 general election, pursuant to which he was elected as the Speaker. He was the first man to serve as Speaker since the end of apartheid, and the first black man ever to serve as Speaker in the South African Parliament. He served in the office throughout the Fourth Parliament but was replaced by Baleka Mbete after the May 2014 general election.

== Early life ==
Sisulu was born on 23 August 1945 in Soweto. He was the eldest of five children born to Albertina and Walter Sisulu, who were prominent anti-apartheid activists in the African National Congress; his younger siblings were Mlungisi, Zwelakhe, Lindiwe, and Nonkululeko. In 1963, when he was aged 19, he and his mother were arrested and detained after his father went into hiding. Shortly after his release, he left South Africa for exile; his father, meanwhile, was apprehended by police later that year and was sentenced to life imprisonment in the Rivonia Trial.

== Exile and early career ==
Leaving South Africa via Gaborone, Botswana, Sisulu travelled to Tanzania, where he joined Umkhonto we Sizwe. Over the next decade, he spent stints in various regions of Africa and Europe. Among other things, he completed a master's degree in political economy from the Plekhanov Russian University of Economics in Moscow in 1969, a senior military training course in Skhodnya, Soviet Union in 1972, and a one year-research fellowship at the University of Amsterdam in 1985. He also spent a period as the ANC's representative in Budapest. From 1986 to 1990, he was stationed at the ANC's headquarters in Lusaka, Zambia, where he was head of the ANC's Department of Economic Planning.

In 1990, Sisulu returned to South Africa amid the negotiations to end apartheid. The following year, he became the founding director of the Director of the National Institute of Economic Policies, an ANC think-tank based in Johannesburg. In addition, in 1993, he completed Master of Public Administration at the Harvard Kennedy School of Government.

== First Parliament: 1994–1998 ==
In South Africa's first post-apartheid elections in April 1994, Sisulu was elected to represent the ANC in the National Assembly, the lower house of the new South African Parliament. He was also appointed as the inaugural chairperson of the portfolio committee that was tasked with oversight of the Reconstruction and Development Programme (RDP), the ANC's flagship economic and social policy; Sisulu had helped draft the policy itself. During the same period, Sisulu rose in the ANC: he was elected to the ANC National Executive Committee (NEC) for the first time at the party's congress in 1994, and in 1997 he was elected both to the NEC and to the smaller National Working Committee (NWC) at the next congress in 1997.

In February 1997, he was appointed as the second Chief Whip of the Majority Party, succeeding Arnold Stofile. Upon taking office, he announced a plan to restore and upgrade the status of Parliament's RDP committee. He also introduced academic training programmes for Members of Parliament and parliamentary staff. However, his tenure as whip was brief: he resigned from Parliament in November 1998 to enter the corporate world.

== Corporate hiatus: 1998–2009 ==
He was deputy chief executive officer of Denel from 1998 to 2001 and then group general manager of Sasol from 2003 to 2006. Thereafter he held various directorships, including at African Rainbow Minerals.

During this period, Sisulu remained active in the ANC; he was re-elected to the NEC, and re-appointed to the NWC, both in December 2002 and then in December 2007. He was particularly prominent as the chairperson of the NEC's Subcommittee on Economic Transformation, and the Mail & Guardian said that he brought "serious business nous" and "much-needed technical expertise" to the NWC.

== Fourth Parliament: 2009–2014 ==
In the April 2009 general election, Sisulu returned to the National Assembly, ranked 39th on the ANC's party list. When Parliament opened on 6 May, he was elected unopposed to replace Gwen Mahlangu-Nkabinde as the Speaker of the National Assembly, with Nomaindia Mfeketo as his deputy. He was nominated to the position by Andrew Mlangeni. The first man to hold the office since 1994, he used his acceptance speech to urge members to "resist the urge" to call him Madam Speaker. He served as Speaker throughout the Fourth Parliament, during which time he was "widely respected" for his fairness and levity. He also oversaw the establishment of the parliamentary budget office.

Simultaneously, Sisulu continued to serve as chairperson of the ANC NEC's Subcommittee on Economic Transformation until after the party's 53rd National Conference in December 2012, when Enoch Godongwana was elected to take over the position. The same conference re-elected Sisulu to his fifth term on the NEC, though he did not return to the NWC.

=== Nkandlagate ===
The end of Sisulu's term as Speaker was partly consumed by the so-called Nkandlagate scandal, which concerned state-funded upgrades to President Jacob Zuma's Nkandla homestead. In March 2014, shortly before the end of the parliamentary term, the Public Protector released a report which concluded that Zuma had benefitted unduly from the upgrades and should be required to repay the state. Opposition parties said that Sisulu was responsive to their requests for the Public Protector's report to be tabled in the National Assembly, and Sisulu ultimately announced that he would establish an ad hoc parliamentary committee to consider the report. Opposition politician Lindiwe Mazibuko welcomed his decision as a "bold move" and "a victory for Parliament, the constitution and accountability".

There were later reports – disputed by the ANC – that Sisulu had been rebuked by the party for establishing the committee. Although the ad hoc committee initially intended to complete its work before the end of the parliamentary term, it did not do so.

=== Departure ===
In the May 2014 general election, Sisulu was ranked 14th on the ANC's party list, but the ANC announced that Baleka Mbete would replace him as Speaker. Steven Friedman and others suggested that the move indicated that the ANC wanted to exert stricter partisan control of the Speaker's office and of Parliament. Sisulu was sworn in as an ordinary Member of Parliament on 21 May, but he resigned from his seat eight days later when he failed to gain appointment to Zuma's cabinet. Observers were surprised by his exclusion, but the ANC strenuously denied rumours that he was being punished for having instigated the Nkandla investigation.

== Retirement ==
After leaving Parliament, Sisulu remained active in the ANC. In 2016, he emerged as a critic of President Zuma, first expressing public dissatisfaction in April in the aftermath of the Economic Freedom Fighters v Speaker judgment. Later that year he called – both in public and during an ANC NEC meeting – for Zuma's resignation. He also said publicly that Zuma's failure to support Finance Minister Pravin Gordhan was "bloody foolish", and he attended a civil society march in support of Gordhan in Pretoria. Sisulu served the remainder of his five-year term as a member of the NEC, but he was not re-elected at the next national conference in December 2017.

On 31 January 2018, he was appointed as an independent non-executive director of Harmony Gold.

== Personal life ==
In 1966, Sisulu married Mercy Vutela, the daughter of activist Greta Ncapayi; she had been his high school sweetheart and reunited with him in exile in Moscow. Their son, Mlungisi, became a diplomat in the South African embassies to Khartoum and Prague; he died of cerebral malaria in London, England in January 2008, aged 40. Sisulu's first marriage was shortlived. His second child, Shaka, was born in 1979 to Makhosazana Msimang, Mendi Msimang's daughter, and went on to become an activist and media personality.

In September 1986, he married Elinor Sisulu, a writer whom he had met in Amsterdam in 1985. She later published a biography of her parents-in-law.
