= Jeremy Maggs =

- Born: 1 February 1961 (age 65); Johannesburg, South Africa
- Occupations: Journalist, television presenter, radio host
- Spouse: Anne Maggs
- Children: 2

Jeremy Maggs (born 1 February 1961) is a South African journalist, radio host and television presenter, best known for hosting the South African version of the game show Who Wants To Be A Millionaire? and for his anchoring roles on top South African 24-hour news channel eNCA on DStv over the past ten years. He has also co-hosted the quiz show Test The Nation and currently hosts his own show "Maggs on Media" - also on the eNews Channel, where he continues to watch the industry. In radio, Maggs co-presented SAfm's weekday afternoon current affairs programme, PM Live, as well as being the host of the Sunday morning media and advertising show, Media @ SAFM which focused on the advertising and communications industry. The programme ran for ten years and Maggs refers to it as his "great joy". He also is an editor, publishing The Annual; a hardcover of the yearly business in the media. In 2014, Maggs joined POWER 98.7 as a radio host of a new slot called Best of POWER - which shines the spotlight on media innovation, technology, trends, culinary inspiration and travel.

== Early life ==
Maggs was born on 1 February 1961 in Johannesburg. He studied journalism at what was then the Natal Technikon, and began a career in journalism writing for such publications as the Eastern Province Herald and Durban's Sunday Tribune.

== Career ==
After leaving Natal Technikon, Maggs embarked on his journalist career writing for publications such as: the Eastern Province Herald and Durban's Sunday Tribune. Maggs continues to write a weekly column for The Herald called 'Daze of My Life'.

Maggs is best known for presenting Who Wants to Be a Millionaire?, which he did from 1999 to 2005. Maggs also became the presenter of Test the Nation and also hosted SABC3's weekly media and advertising show, Media Focus.

His first foray into radio was with Radio 702 where he stayed for a decade and in the process, he became the station's news editor and a regular current affairs anchor - at one point in a memorable breakfast show partnership with 702's Jenny Crwys-Williams – with a reputation as a tough interviewer. Maggs gained attention for breaking the story of the Assassination of Chris Hani and co-hosted a live rolling news program on the death of Diana, Princess of Wales in 1997. After leaving 702, Maggs went to present the SABC2 breakfast show which he co-hosted with Nothemba Madumo. This show led him to present Media@SAfm and then to AM Live after the resignation of John Perlman.

In August 2007, Maggs was announced to be the editor of a magazine called Mags which itself is about content relating to magazines.

In February 2008, Maggs joined the e.Sat pay channel's 24-hour news programme as one of the co-anchors. In the process, he left AM Live in March 2008. Maggs hosted alongside Redi Direko until May 2009, when Nikiwe Bikitsha took her place.

Maggs was also the editor of the Journal of Marketing which was the official publication of the Marketing Association of South Africa (MASA). l of Marketing. He was previously the advertising and media writer on the Financial Mail and had responsibility for the authoritative yearly industry review called Ad Focus. He now publishes his own hardcover review of the industry called The Annual and serves as editor-in-chief for the popular, revitalised version of the Journal of Marketing, The Redzone.

== Personal life ==
Maggs has lived in Johannesburg all his life. He and his wife Anne have two daughters. He is an avid reader and collector of books and enjoys cycling in his spare time.
