= Zwelakhe Sisulu =

South African journalist, editor, and newspaper founder (1950–2012)

OMG Zwelakhe Sisulu
- Born: 17 December 1950
- Died: 4 October 2012 (aged 61)
- Education: Orlando High (Soweto)
- Occupations: Journalist, editor, newspaper founder
- Years active: 1975–88
- Employer(s): South African Associated Newspapers; The Rand Daily Mail; Sunday Post; Sowetan; New Nation
- Known for: anti-apartheid activism and journalism against Apartheid
- Notable work: 1976 Soweto uprising
- Television: South African Broadcast Corporation
- Political party: African National Congress
- Movement: anti-Apartheid activism
- Spouse: Zodwa Sisulu
- Parent(s): Walter Sisulu; Albertina Sisulu
- Relatives: Max Sisulu (brother); Mlungisi Sisulu (brother); Lindiwe Sisulu (sister); Elinor Sisulu (sister-in-law)
- Awards: Nieman Fellowship; Louis Lyons Award for Courageous Journalism; International Human Rights Law Group Award; Union of Swedish Journalists Award; Rothko Chapel Award for Human Rights

Zwelakhe Sisulu (17 December 1950 – 4 October 2012) was a South African black journalist, editor, and newspaper founder. He was president of the Writers' Association of South Africa, which later became the Black Media Workers Association of South Africa (or Mwasa), and he led a year-long strike in 1980 for fair wages for black journalists. Under apartheid, he was imprisoned at least three times for his journalism. After apartheid ended, he became the chief executive officer of the South African Broadcast Corporation.

== Personal history ==
Zwelakhe Sisulu's family is well known for its struggle against Apartheid in South Africa. He was the son of anti-Apartheid activists and African National Congress members Walter Sisulu and Albertina Sisulu. He was the brother of Max Sisulu, Speaker of the National Assembly, and Lindiwe Sisulu, Minister of Public Service and Administration. His father was sentenced to life in prison in 1964 when Zwelakhe Sisulu was 13 years old.

Sisulu and his wife Zodwa had 2 sons and 1 daughter.

== Career ==
Zwelakhe Sisulu began his career in journalism in 1975 when he worked as an intern for South African Associated Newspapers. He then became a journalist for The Rand Daily Mail where he covered the Soweto uprising in 1976 and remained there until 1978. He was news editor of the Sunday Post (South Africa) until his ban in 1980. While at the Sunday Post, he was sentenced to prison for his refusal to reveal information about sources of one of his reporters and he led a 1980 strike which resulted in his ban from journalism for several years. After his house arrest, he was a Nieman Fellow. After his fellowship was complete in 1985, he worked for Sowetan. In 1986, he founded the New Nation (defunct since 30 May 1997), before he was arrested by police and held without a trial as part of the emergency and mass arrests in South Africa at the time. The newspaper was editorially aligned with the African National Congress, which stated on its masthead: "The media of the powerless." At the time it was South Africa's largest black newspaper. After his release from a 2-year detention and after the ban was lifted on the ANC, Sisulu served as Nelson Mandela's press secretary and also the director of information of the African National Congress.

In post-Apartheid South Africa, Sisulu became the head of the South African Broadcast Corporation in 1994.

After his stint at SABC, Sisulu founded New African Investments Limited, which is known as the first black-owned business on the Johannesburg Stock Exchange and black empowerment. Holdings of the company include the publishing house David Philip, Soweto TV and Primedia Broadcasting.

== Early activism ==
Zwelakhe Sisulu walked a fine line between journalism and activism already while at The Rand Daily Mail. In 1977, he became president of the Writers' Association of South Africa. As president, he led a march with his fellow black journalists and then was briefly jailed. Sisulu's editor admonished him for his explanation that he was making use of his freedom of assembly. His editor told him, "You don't march, you write."

Sisulu first came to international attention in a case involving the surveillance of black journalists. While an editor at the Sunday Post in 1979, Sisulu was questioned by authorities about his knowledge of a source used by journalist Thamsanqa Gerald Mkhwanazi. Sisulu was sentenced for nine months in prison for refusing to co-operate. For the first time, police acknowledged in his case the practice of using wiretaps on journalists' telephones, which had been widely suspected.

== Strike and arrest ==
Zwelakhe Sisulu was the leader of the union during Mwasa's strike for fair wages for black journalists in 1980. It was the first strike by black journalists. After the strike was over, he lost his job, was banned from journalism, and ordered under house arrest for three years until 1983. Zwelakhe Sisulu's arrest on 30 June 1981 was attributed to the Internal Security Act. Other leaders who shared the same fate were Phil Mtimkhulu, Mathatha Tsedu, Subri Govende and Joe Thloloe.

He was a Nieman Fellow from 1984–1985.

== New Nation and 1986 arrests ==
Zwelakhe Sisulu was arrested twice in 1986.

Police swept him away from his home for the first time on 27 June 1986. Sisulu later called them "armed bandits." The government announced his detention one week later. There were calls from abroad to release him, such as one from the American Society of Newspaper Editors (ASNE). He was released on 18 July 1986.

Zwelakhe Sisulu had already been appointed director of the Board for a new organisation ARTICLE 19 at the time of his second arrest 12 December 1986. He was detained at John Vorster Square where other activists were also imprisoned. The organization made his case its first campaign. He was released after two years but not allowed to continue his work as a journalist. Years later, he stated his belief that the publicity of organisations like ARTICLE 19 during the time of his imprisonment saved his life.

== South African Broadcasting Corporation ==
He was the CEO of the South African Broadcasting Corporation from September 1994 to 1997. Under Sisulu's leadership in a democratic South Africa, the SABC was reorganized and relaunched on 4 February 1996. A controversy was created over the redistribution of resources for other languages besides Afrikaans, which had received special privileges under the Apartheid system.

Later, Sisulu was appointed as a commissioner to investigate censorship at the SABC that had been alleged by whistleblower John Perlman.

== Awards ==
Sisulu was awarded an Order of Mapungubwe - Gold, posthumously for "his exceptional contribution to quality journalism; and as a reporter exposing the cruelties of apartheid and encouraging unity among the people of different political persuasions to fight for liberation.")

== See also ==
- History of the African National Congress
- Media of South Africa
