= Snuki Zikalala =

Snuki Joseph Zikalala is the president of the African National Congress (ANC) Veterans' League in South Africa, and former managing director of news and current affairs of the South African Broadcasting Corporation.

Zikalala is 90th on the ANC national party list in the 2024 South African general election.

== Early life ==
Before joining the SABC, Zikalala spent 25 years in journalism and earned numerous awards, including the SA Medical Association's best medical reporter and government's communicator of the year.

== Education ==
Zikalala holds a BA Hons (industrial sociology ) from Wits University and an MA and PhD, both in journalism, from Sofia University, Bulgaria.

== Criticism ==
During his role at the SABC, Zikalala attracted criticism for his pro-ANC stance. He was accused of using the publicly funded national broadcaster as a propaganda tool, sparking fears of a return to the days when the apartheid government used it as such.

Zikalala blacklisted various independent commentators from appearing on national television, and was harshly criticized by an independent commission for doing so.

Zikalala stated in an address given at Stellenbosch University that "The SABC is not the mouthpiece of the government of the day, nor should it broadcast its opinion of government policies, unless they relate directly to broadcasting matters". In the same address he accused Rupert Murdoch's media company of having "an unashamedly neo-liberal agenda".

In an attempt to hit back at the print media, Zikalala oversaw the launching of a program called In the Public Interest. Zikalala stated that "just as the print criticises us, we will be able to criticise them". In a response, the Freedom of Expression Institute criticized this move, stating that "The SABC is merely the custodian of this public resource. It is inappropriate for the SABC to use a public resource as a platform for individuals in the SABC to settle scores with individuals in other media."

Zikalala also continually denied the ongoing crisis in Zimbabwe. During an interview with Jeremy Maggs on SAfm he stated that "There is food, it's just very expensive". In the same interview he also said that during his stay at the Sheraton in Harare he had been able to order Johnnie Walker Black Label and mineral water and accordingly didn't understand what everyone was on about.

On 6 May 2008, Snuki Zikalala was suspended with immediate effect by Dali Mpofu, Group CEO of the SABC. Soon afterwards, Dali Mpofu himself was suspended by the SABC board.
