= Beryl Sisulu =

South African diplomat (born 1948)

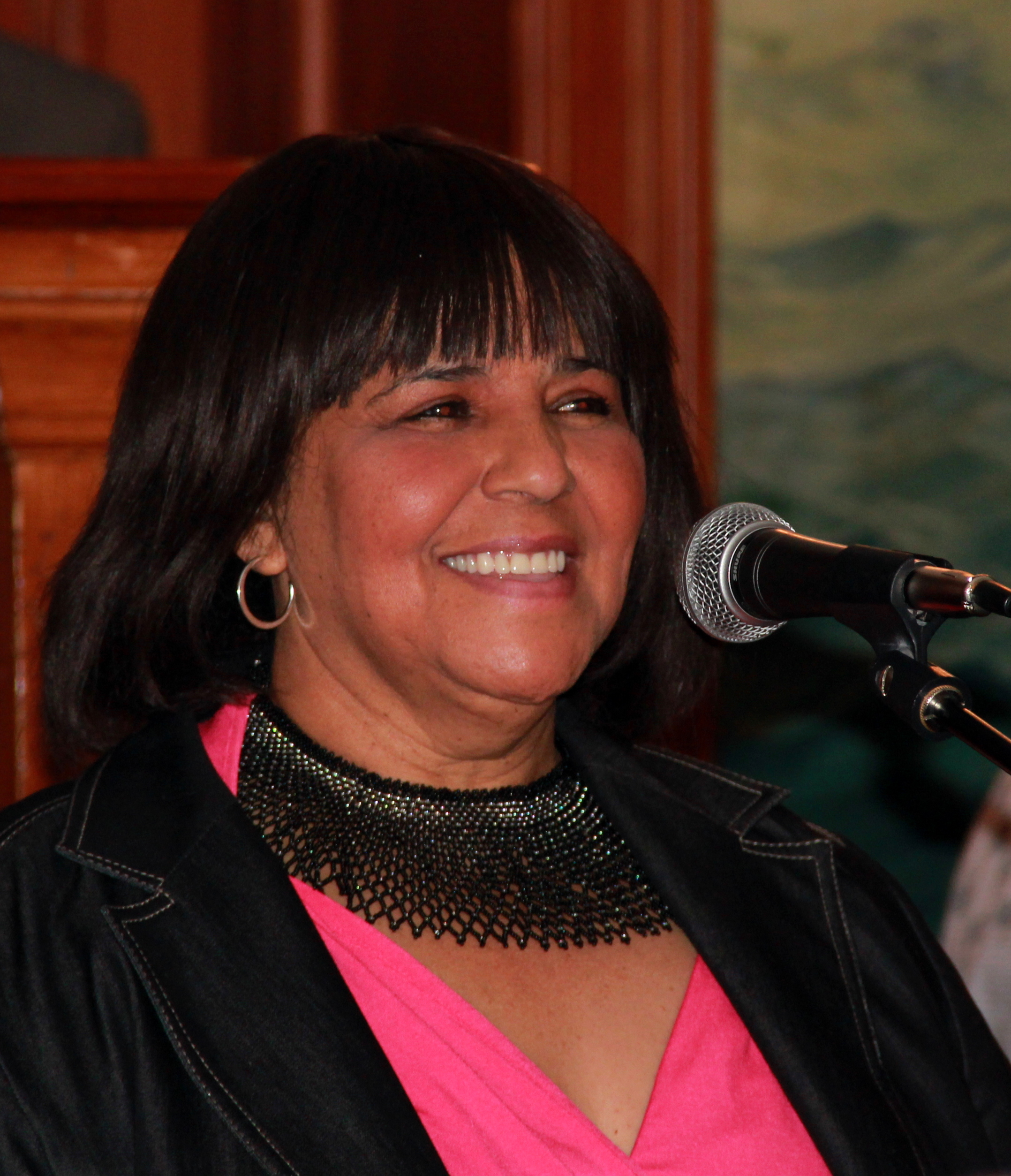
- Sisulu in June 2012

Personal details
- Born: Beryl Rose Lockman; 1948 (age 77–78) Soweto, Transvaal; Union of South Africa
- Party: African National Congress
- Relations: Walter Sisulu (uncle)
- Education: University of Natal

Beryl Rose Sisulu (née Lockman; born 1948) is a South African diplomat and lawyer who is currently serving as South African Ambassador to Mexico, having been appointed to that position in 2023. She is the adopted daughter of Albertina and Walter Sisulu.

== Early life and career ==
Sisulu was born in 1948 in Soweto in the former Transvaal Province. After her mother, Rosabella Lockman (née Sisulu), died, she and her elder brother, Gerald, were raised in Soweto by their maternal uncle, political activist Walter Sisulu, and his wife Albertina Sisulu. She attended high school at St Michael's School in Swaziland and later completed a law degree at the University of Natal.

In subsequent years, she worked at Black Sash as regional director for KwaZulu-Natal; qualified as an attorney during her articles at the Legal Resources Centre; and worked at the Department of Justice. She married Leonard Simelane.

== Diplomatic career ==
Sisulu is a career diplomat. She was appointed as Ambassador to Norway in 2009, Ambassador to Japan in 2016, High Commissioner to Australia in 2017, and Ambassador to Greece in 2019. On October 18, 2023, she presented her credentials as Ambassador of South Africa to Mexico, concurrent to Guatemala, El Salvador, Honduras, Nicaragua, Costa Rica and Panama.
