= Elinor Sisulu =

South African writer and activist

- Born: Elinor Batezat; 1958 (age 67–68); Salisbury, Rhodesia (now Harare, Zimbabwe)
- Education: University of Zimbabwe; International Institute of Social Studies
- Occupations: Writer and activist
- Notable work: Walter and Albertina Sisulu: In Our Lifetime
- Spouse: Max Sisulu (m. 1986)
- Awards: Noma Award for Publishing in Africa

Elinor Sisulu (née Batezat; born 1958) is a South African author and founder of the Puku Children's Literature Foundation. She was awarded the Chevalier de L'Ordre des Artes et des Lettres by the French government and the UNESCO King Sejong Literacy Prize.

== Early years and education ==
She was born Elinor Batezat in Salisbury, Rhodesia (now Harare, Zimbabwe), to Francis Batezat and Betty Stuhardt, who was the daughter of George Stuhardt. Elinor grew up in Bulawayo. She was educated at the University of Zimbabwe, at the United Nations Institute for Economic Planning and Development in Dakar, Senegal, and at the International Institute of Social Studies in The Hague. While in Holland, she met Max Sisulu, whom she would later marry.

== Activist career ==
She worked as an economic researcher for the Ministry of Labour in Zimbabwe. From 1987 to 1990, she worked at the Lusaka office of the International Labour Organization. Sisulu returned to Johannesburg, South Africa, with her family in 1991 after the end of apartheid. She worked mainly as a freelance writer and editor from 1991 to 1998.

Sisulu helped establish the Crisis Coalition of Zimbabwe and works in its Johannesburg office. She has prepared reports for the Independent Electoral Authority of South Africa and for the World Food Programme. She organized a symposium for Themba Lesizwe on Civil Society and Justice in Zimbabwe, held in Johannesburg in 2003.

Sisulu is a board member of the Open Society Initiative for Southern Africa

== Literary career ==
In 1994, Sisulu wrote a children's book entitled The Day Gogo Went to Vote, about the first democratic election held in South Africa. In 2002, she published a biography about her husband's parents, entitled Walter and Albertina Sisulu: In Our Lifetime, which received the Noma Award for Publishing in Africa and was runner-up for the Sunday Times Alan Paton Non-Fiction Award.

Her shorter writings include "A different kind of holocaust: a personal reflection on HIV/AIDS" (African Gender Institute Newsletter 7, University of Cape Town, December 2000) and "The 50th anniversary of the 1956 Women's March: a personal recollection" (Feminist Africa, 2006). Sisulu wrote the foreword to Jestina Mukoko's 2016 book The Abduction and Trial of Jestina Mukoko: The Fight for Human Rights in Zimbabwe.

Sisulu is a board member of the National Arts Festival, a trustee for the Heal Zimbabwe Trust and chair of the Book Development Foundation of the Centre for the Book in Cape Town. She is founder and executive director of the Puku Children's Literature Foundation.

== Awards and honours ==
Sisulu's biography Walter and Albertina Sisulu: In Our Lifetime (2002) was the recipient of the Noma Prize for the best African book for 2003.

For her work with the Puku Children's Literature Foundation, the French government awarded her the Chevalier de L'Ordre des Artes et des Lettres and the UNESCO King Sejong Literacy Prize.

In 2019, she was awarded an honorary doctorate by the University of Pretoria.

In 2023, Sisulu received the South African Literary Awards Chairperson's Achievement Certificate and Trophy for her "outstanding work in the Children's Literature space over many years as an author, advocate for indigenous languages and as an activist for inclusion in children's access to books."

== Bibliography ==
- The Day Gogo Went to Vote (children's book), 1994
- Walter and Albertina Sisulu: In Our Lifetime, 2002

=== Selected articles ===
- "Nelson Mandela remembered", The Observer, 15 December 2013.
- "Appreciation: Chenjerai Hove, 1956-2015", The Observer, 26 July 2015.
- "Lagos, one long literary and artistic lime", Johannesburg Review of Books, 5 June 2017.
- "The 'Precarious' Pathway To Democracy Post-Mugabe", HuffPost, 15 November 2017.
- "Reflections on an afternoon in Coyaba", Johannesburg Review of Books, 5 August 2019.
