= 1964 in South Africa =

- Decades: 1940s; 1950s; 1960s; 1970s; 1980s
- See also: 1964 in South African sport; List of years in South Africa

The following lists events that happened during 1964 in South Africa.

== Incumbents ==
- State President: Charles Robberts Swart.
- Prime Minister: Hendrik Verwoerd.
- Chief Justice: Lucas Cornelius Steyn.

== Events ==
January

- 31 – The University of Port Elizabeth is established.

February

- South Africa is suspended from the International Labour Organization.

March

- 11 – South Africa withdraws from the International Labour Organization.

June

- 5 – South Africa is expelled from the Universal Postal Union in Vienna.
- 12 – In the Rivonia Trial, Nelson Mandela's original 5-year sentence is extended to life sentence for high treason together with Denis Goldberg, Ahmed Kathrada, Govan Mbeki, Raymond Mhlaba, Andrew Mlangeni, Elias Motsoaledi and Walter Sisulu.

July

- 17 – Nelson Mandela is awarded the Joliot Curie Gold Medal for Peace.
- 24 – John Harris, a schoolteacher, explodes a bomb at Park Station, killing 77-year-old Ethel Rhys and injuring 23 others.

August

- 18 – The International Olympic Committee bans South Africa from the Tokyo Olympics on the grounds that its teams are racially segregated.

November

- 6 – Vuyisile Mini is being hanged due to death penalty for treason together with Wilson Khayinga and Zinakile Mkaba.

Unknown date

- The African National Congress establishes offices in Dar-es-Salaam.
- The Mahotella Queens are formed by producer Rupert Bopape in the Johannesburg studios of Gallo Record Company.
- The Munitions Production Board is formed in order to develop South African self-sufficiency in the manufacturing of arms.
- Neville Alexander is imprisoned on Robben Island.

November

- The Little Rivonia Trial begins.

December

- In the Little Rivonia Trial, sentence was introduced for another treason:
  Wilton Mkwayi received life sentence; Dave Kitson twenty years; Laloo Chiba eighteen years; John Matthews fifteen years and Mac Maharaj twelve years.

== Births ==
- 13 January – Laurette Maritz, golfer
- 21 January – Mark Gleeson (journalist), soccer commentator & journalist
- 24 February – Wendy Oldfield, singer
- 18 March – Yvonne Chaka Chaka, singer & businesswoman
- 5 April – Buyelekhaya Dalindyebo, King of the abaThembu
- 15 April – André Joubert, rugby player
- 13 April – Colleen De Reuck, long-distance runner
- 16 May – Kobus Wiese, former rugby player & tv personality
- 18 May – Balie Swart, rugby player
- 10 June – Keketso Semoko, actress and producer
- 11 July – Gavin Hunt, football coach
- 20 July – Deon Lotz, actor
- 26 July – Pitso Mosimane, former football player & coach
- 3 August – Lucky Dube, reggae musician (d. 2007)
- 19 August – Hector Pieterson, schoolboy who was shot and killed in Soweto uprising (d. 1976)
- 4 September – Menzi Ngubane, actor (d. 2021)
- 1 October – Roger De Sa, former football player & coach
- 5 October – Masoja Msiza, actor and poet
- 3 November – Brenda Fassie, singer (d. 2004)
- 12 December – Ringo Madlingozi, musician

== Deaths ==
- 7 June – Charlie Llewellyn, first non-white South African test cricketer. (b. 1876)
- 6 November – Vuyisile Mini, South African anti-apartheid activist. (b. 1920)

== Railways ==
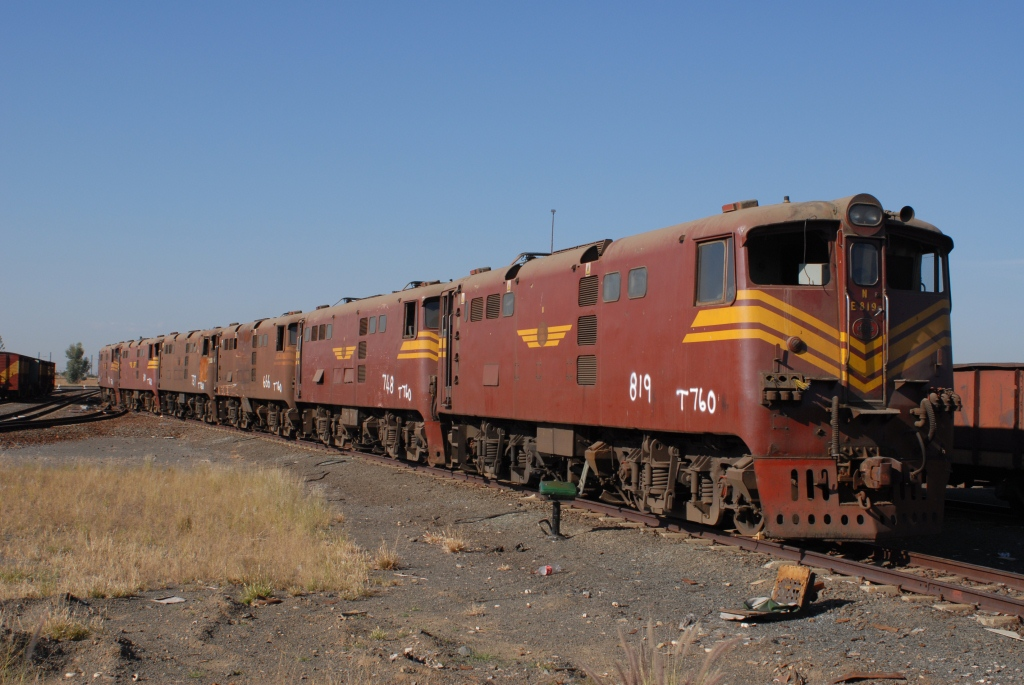
Class 5E1, Series 3

=== Locomotives ===
- The South African Railways places the first of one hundred Class 5E1, Series 3 electric locomotives in mainline service, built by Union Carriage & Wagon in Nigel, Transvaal.

== Sports ==
- Papwa Sewgolum, an Indian golfer, wins the Dutch Open tournament for the third time.
