= Robben Island (prison) =

Former prison off the coast of Cape Town, South Africa

Maximum Security Prison
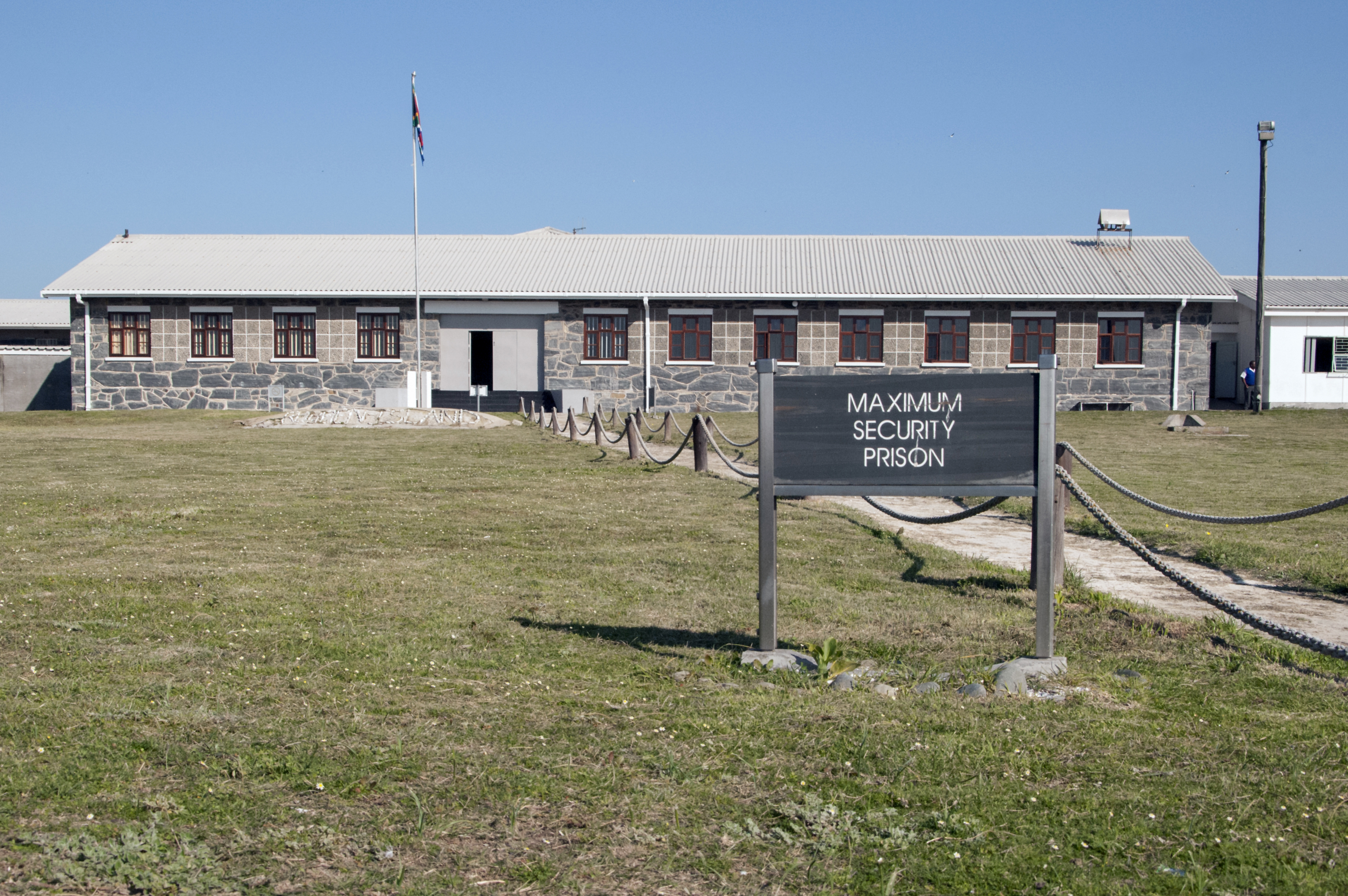
- Prison building

- Location in Cape Town
- Location: Robben Island, Cape Town; 33°48′01″S 18°22′16″E
- Status: Inactive
- Security class: Maximum-minimum
- Opened: 1961
- Closed: 1996
- Managed by: South African government
- Website: robben-island.org.za

Notable prisoners
- Nelson Mandela, Kgalema Motlanthe, Jacob Zuma

Robben Island Prison is an inactive prison on Robben Island in Table Bay, 6.9 kilometers (4.3 mi) west of the coast of Bloubergstrand, Cape Town, South Africa. Nobel Laureate and former President of South Africa Nelson Mandela was imprisoned there for 18 of the 27 years he served behind bars before the fall of apartheid. Since then, three former inmates of the prison (Mandela, Kgalema Motlanthe, and Jacob Zuma) have gone on to become President of South Africa.

It is a South African National Heritage Site as well as a UNESCO World Heritage Site.

== History ==
Beginning in 1961, the prison was used by the South African government for political prisoners and convicted criminals. The maximum security prison for political prisoners closed in 1991 and the medium security prison for criminal prisoners was closed five years later in 1996.

Robben Island Prison had, by the time of Nelson Mandela's imprisonment, long been viewed as "a symbol of oppression" by many black South Africans.

== List of former prisoners ==
- Neville Alexander, proponent of a multilingual South Africa and former revolutionary
- Autshumato (probably around 1625 – 1665), one of the first activists against colonialism, and a Robben Island prisoner from 1658 to around 1660.
- Imam Abdallah ibn Qadi Abdus Salaam (also known as Tuan Guru), imprisoned from 1780 until 1793 for his anti-colonial activities against the Dutch.
- Klaas Blank, first convict executed for sodomy
- Dennis Brutus, former activist and poet
- Patrick Chamusso, former activist of the African National Congress
- Laloo Chiba, former accused at Little Rivonia Trial
- Ebrahim Ismail Ebrahim, South African anti-apartheid activist of Indian-origin and member of the ANC's armed wing Umkhonto We Sizwe.
- Nelson Diale, South African politician and anti-apartheid activist
- Eddie Daniels, anti-apartheid activist
- Jerry Ekandjo, Namibian politician
- Nceba Faku, former Metro Mayor of Port Elizabeth
- Joe Gqabi, former ANC activist
- Harry Gwala, former ANC activist
- Nkwenkwe Nkomo, South African politician activist
- Petrus Iilonga, Namibian trade unionist, activist and politician
- Ahmed Kathrada, former Rivonia Trialist and long-serving prisoner
- Koesaaij, Malagasy co-leader of the Meermin slave mutiny in February, 1766
- Langalibalele, The King of the Hlubi people, one of the first activists against colonialism
- John Kenneth Malatji, former activist and special forces of ANC – Tladi, Soweto
- Njongonkulu Ndungane, later to become Archbishop of Cape Town
- Mosiuoa Lekota, imprisoned in 1974, President and Leader of the Congress of the People
- Mac Maharaj, former accused at Little Rivonia Trial
- Makana, one of the activists against colonialism
- Vusumzi Make, former PAC activist
- Clarence Makwetu, former PAC Activist
- Nelson Mandela, African National Congress leader and former president of South Africa (first black president)
- Gamzo Mandierd, activist
- Jeff Masemola, the first prisoner sentenced to life imprisonment in the apartheid era
- Amos Masondo, former mayor of Johannesburg
- Massavana, Malagasy leader of the Meermin slave mutiny in February, 1766
- Michael Matsobane, leader of Young African Religious Movement. Sentenced at Bethal in 1979; released by PW Botha in 1987.
- Chief Maqoma, former chief who died on the island in 1873
- Govan Mbeki, father of former president of South Africa Thabo Mbeki. Govan was sentenced to life in 1963 but was released from Robben Island in 1987 by PW Botha
- Wilton Mkwayi, former accused at Little Rivonia Trial
- Andrew Mlangeni, former Rivonia Trialist
- Johnson Mlambo, former PAC activist
- Murphy Morobe, Soweto Uprising student leader
- Dikgang Moseneke, Deputy Chief Justice of South Africa
- Zephania Mothopeng, former PAC activist
- Elias Motsoaledi, former Rivonia Trialist
- Sayed Abdurahman Moturu, the Prince of Madura, one of Cape Town's first imams, who was exiled to the island in 1740 and died there in 1754
- Griffiths Mxenge, a South African Lawyer and member of the African National Congress
- Billy Nair, former Rivonia Trialist and ANC/SACP leader
- M. D. Naidoo, a South African lawyer and member of the African National Congress
- John ya Otto Nankudhu, Namibian liberation fighter
- Peter Nchabeleng, South African trade unionist and anti-apartheid activist
- Elleck Nchabeleng, South African politician
- John Nkosi, Serving life but released by PW Botha in 1987
- Jan Shoba, leader in the Azanian People's Liberation Army
- Samuel Sisulu Founder of South African Freedom Organisation
- Nongqawuse, the Xhosa prophetess responsible for the Cattle Killing
- Maqana Nxele, former Xhosa prophet who drowned while trying to escape
- John Nyathi Pokela, co-founder and former chairman of the PAC
- Joe Seremane, former chairperson of the Democratic Alliance.
- Tokyo Sexwale, businessman and aspirant leader of the African National Congress
- Gaus Shikomba, Namibian politician
- Walter Sisulu, former ANC Activist
- Raymond Mhlaba, former ANC Activist and first former Premier of the Eastern Cape.
- Stone Sizani, ANC Chief Whip
- Robert Sobukwe, former leader of the PAC
- Seth Mazibuko, youngest member of the South African Students' Organisation that planned and led the Soweto uprising
- Steve Tshwete, former ANC Activist
- Moses Twebe, former ANC Activist
- Andimba Toivo ya Toivo, Namibian politician
- Sakaria Nashandi, Namibian politician
- Jacob Zuma, former president of South Africa and leader of the African National Congress
- Achmad Cassiem, former leader of the Pan-Africanist Congress (PAC) and leader of the Qibla movement
- Setsiba Paul Mohohlo, former APLA unit commander
- Micheal Ludumo Buka, former ANC Activist
- Kgalema Motlanthe, Former deputy president of the African National Congress and South Africa's third president since the dawn of democracy
- John Aifheli Thabo, an ANC political activist
- Ezra Mvuyisi Sigwela, an ANC political activist
- Xolani Casper Jonas, an ANC political activist
- Kwezi Nontsikelo, ANC political activist, Advisor to the Minister of Defence
- King Sigcau kaMqikela, Mpondo royal king, grandson of King Faku kaNgqungqushe and one of the first activists against colonialism
- Kisten Moonsamy, former Rivonia Trialist
- Dimitri Tsafendas, Greek-Mozambican lifelong political militant and the assassin of Prime Minister of South Africa Hendrik Verwoerd
- Stephen Dlamini, ANC activist
- Peter Mokaba, former ANC Activist
- Vejaynand Ramlakan, former ANC Activist
- George Naicker, prominent anti-apartheid activist
- Zakaria Modobi Maholobela, a.k.a. Zakaria Modipi Maholobela, an ANC political activist
- Jeremy Vearey, ANC activist
- Lazarus !Guiteb, Namibian freedom fighter, PLAN commissar (1942- July 2025)
- Wilbard Sakaria Niitembu Ihuhwa, Namibian freedom fighter (09 February 1953 - 08 September 2025)
- Ephraim Mogale, South African politician and former anti-apartheid activist.
- Thabo Makunyane, South African politician and former anti-apartheid activist.

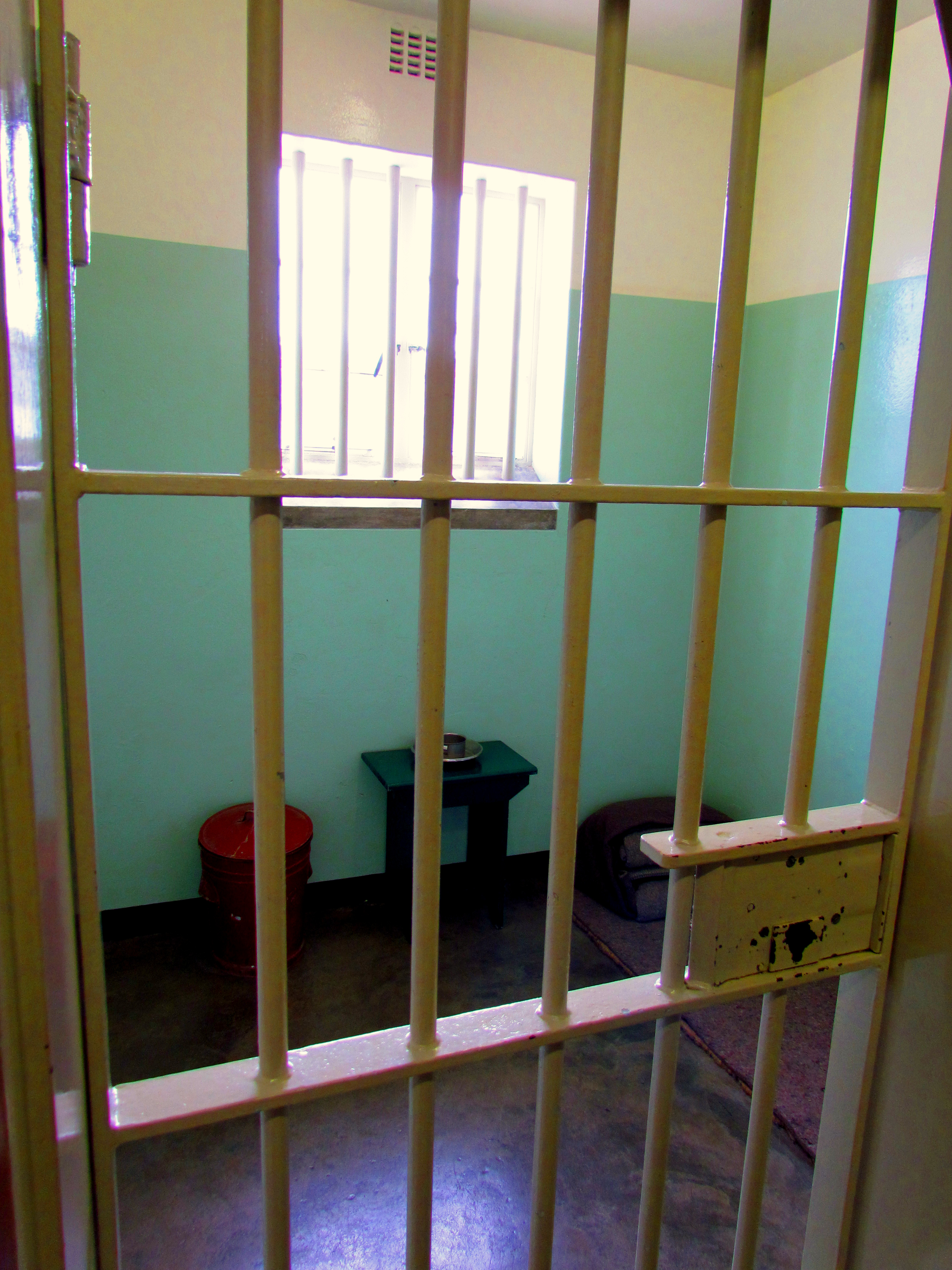
Nelson Mandela's prison cell

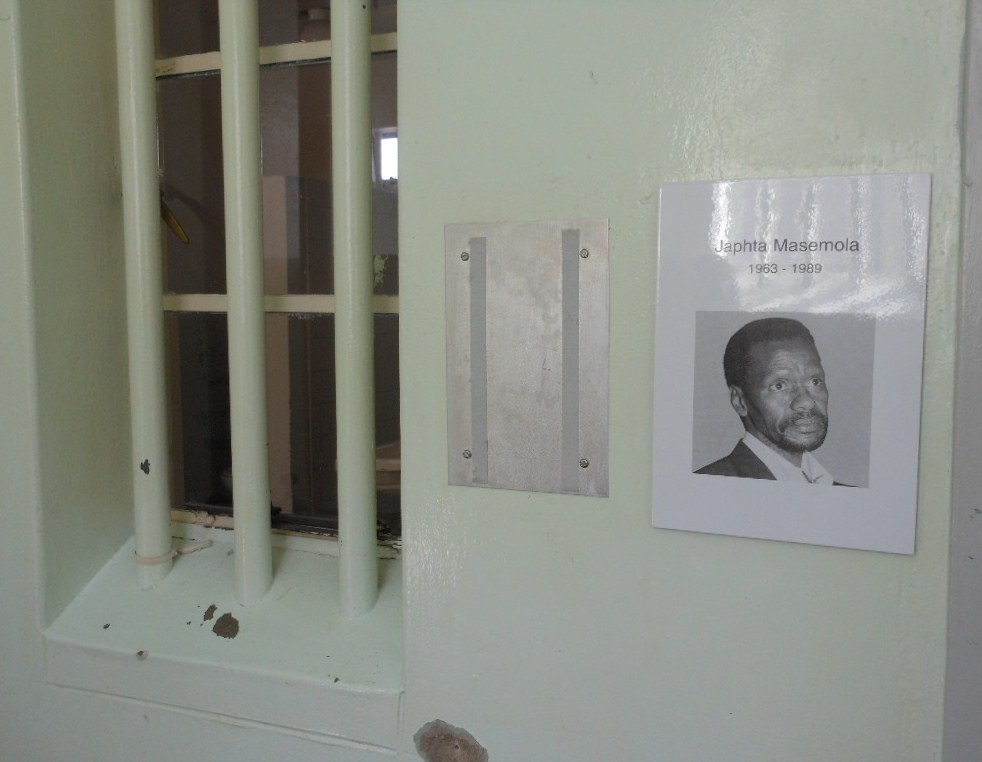
Japhta Masemola's prison cell

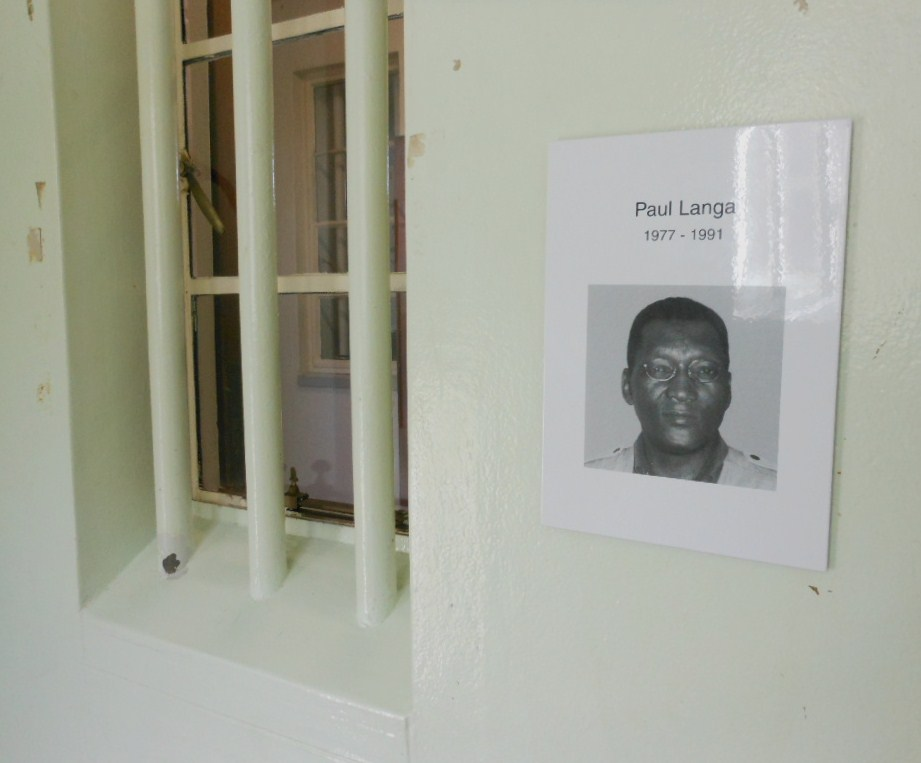
Paul Langa's prison cell

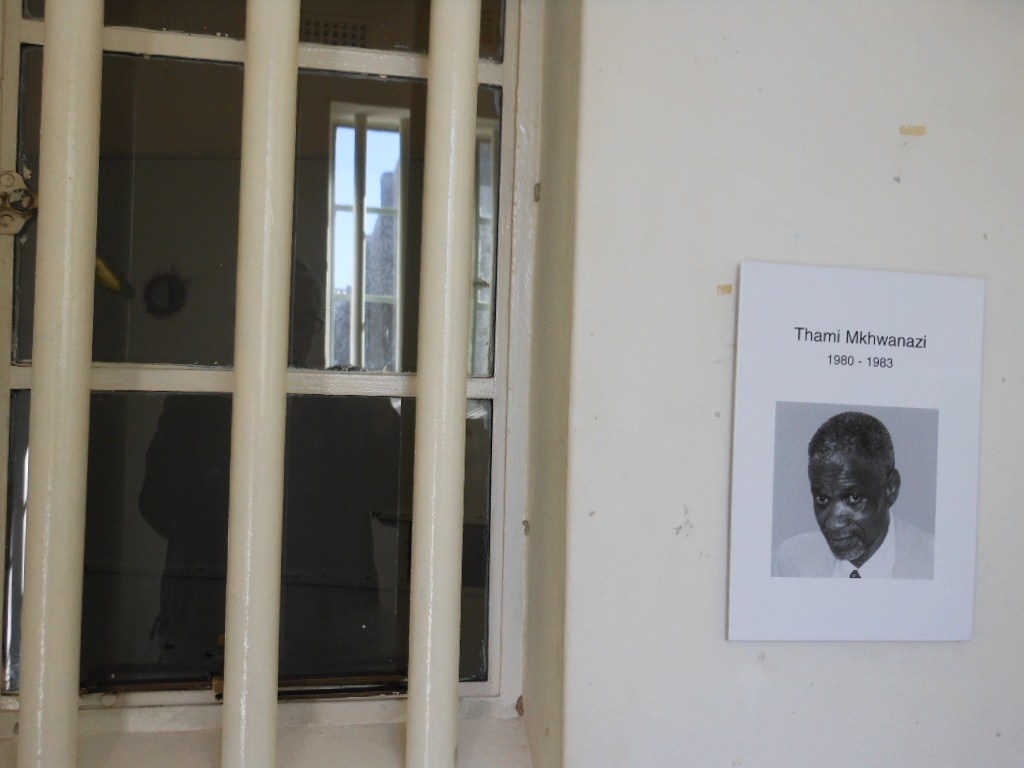
Thami Mkhwanazi's prison cell

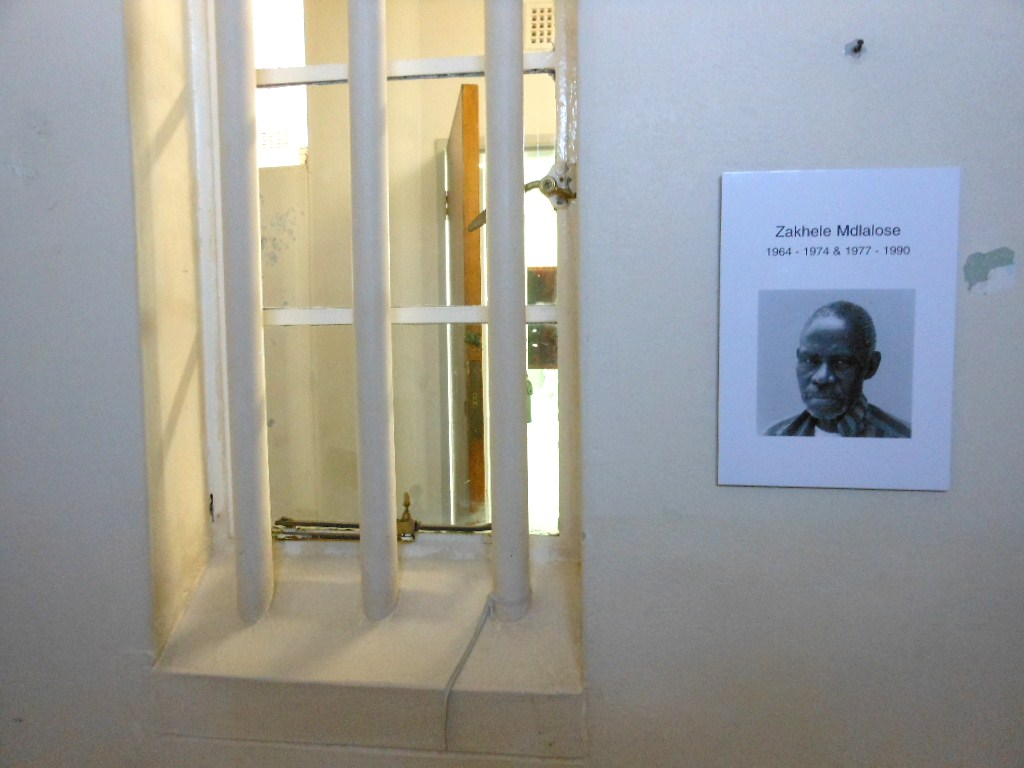
Zahkele Mdlalose's prison cell

== Gallery ==
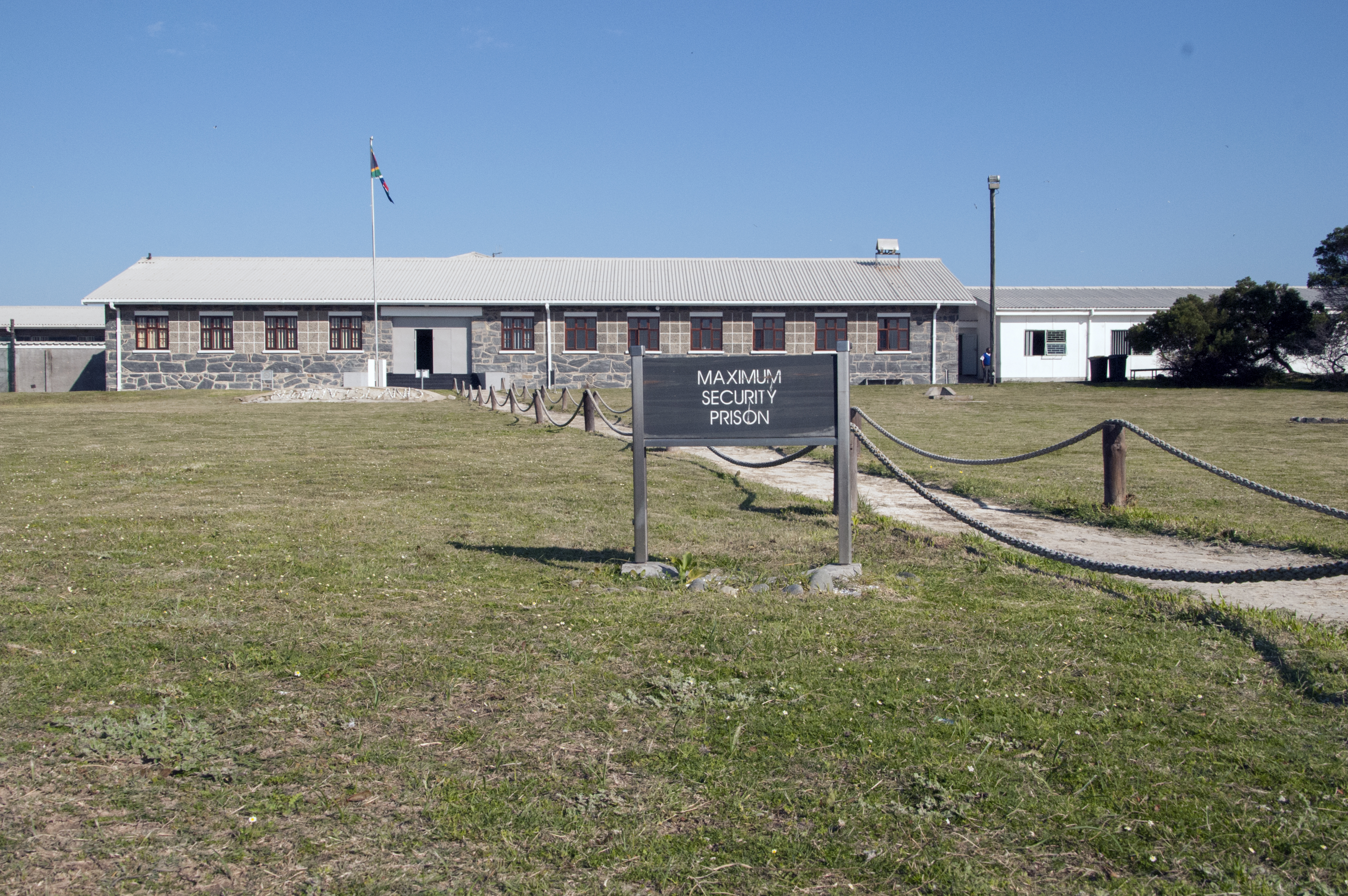
Prison

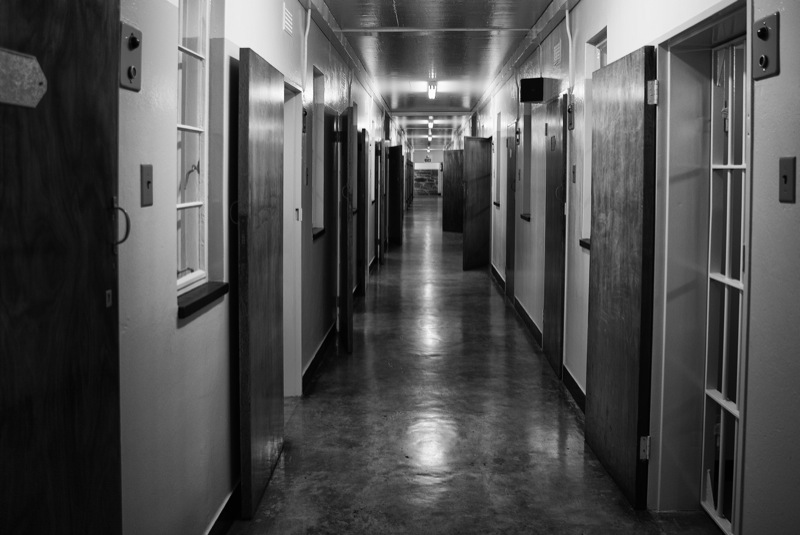
Former prison cells and corridor

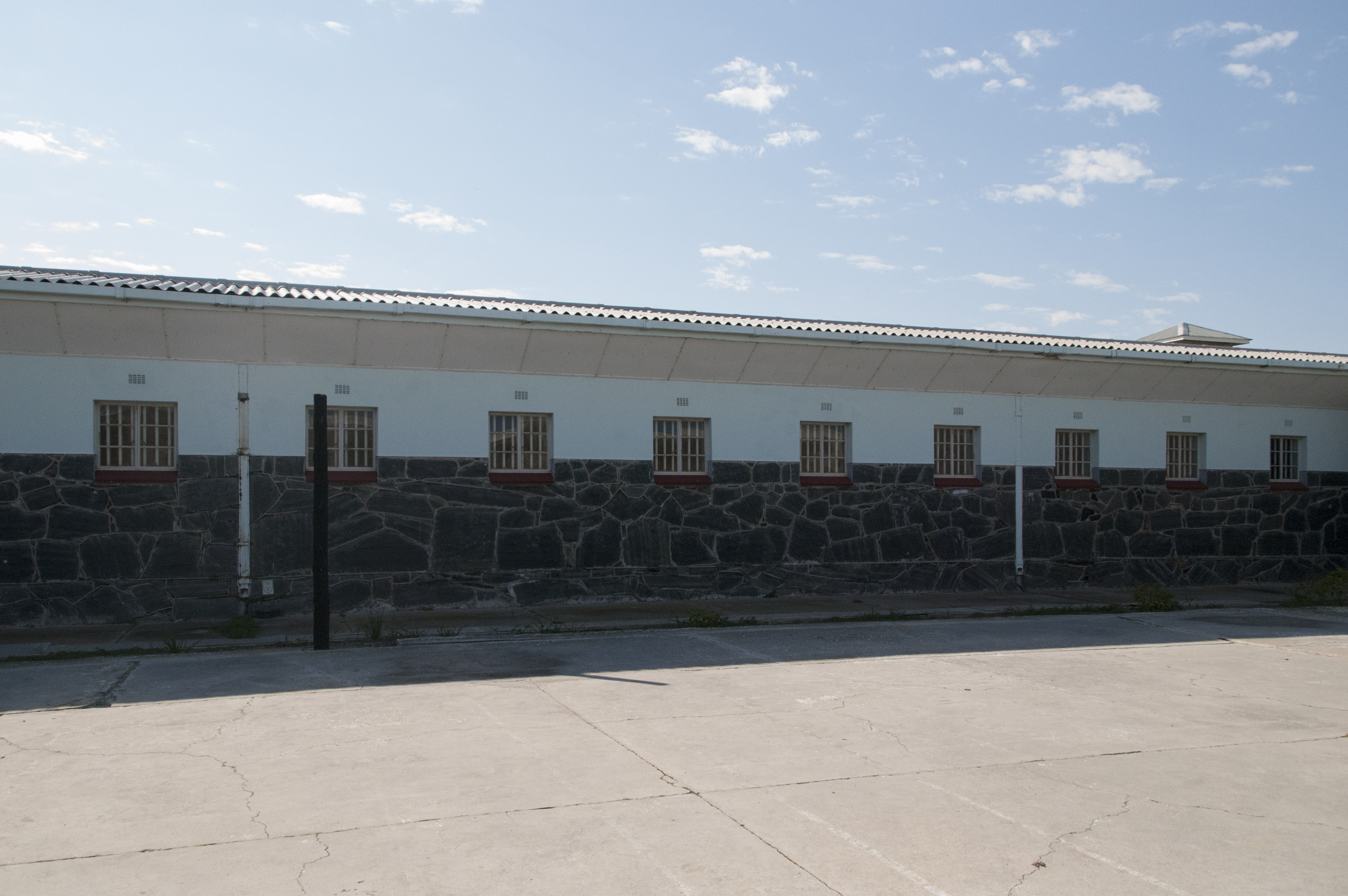
Backyard

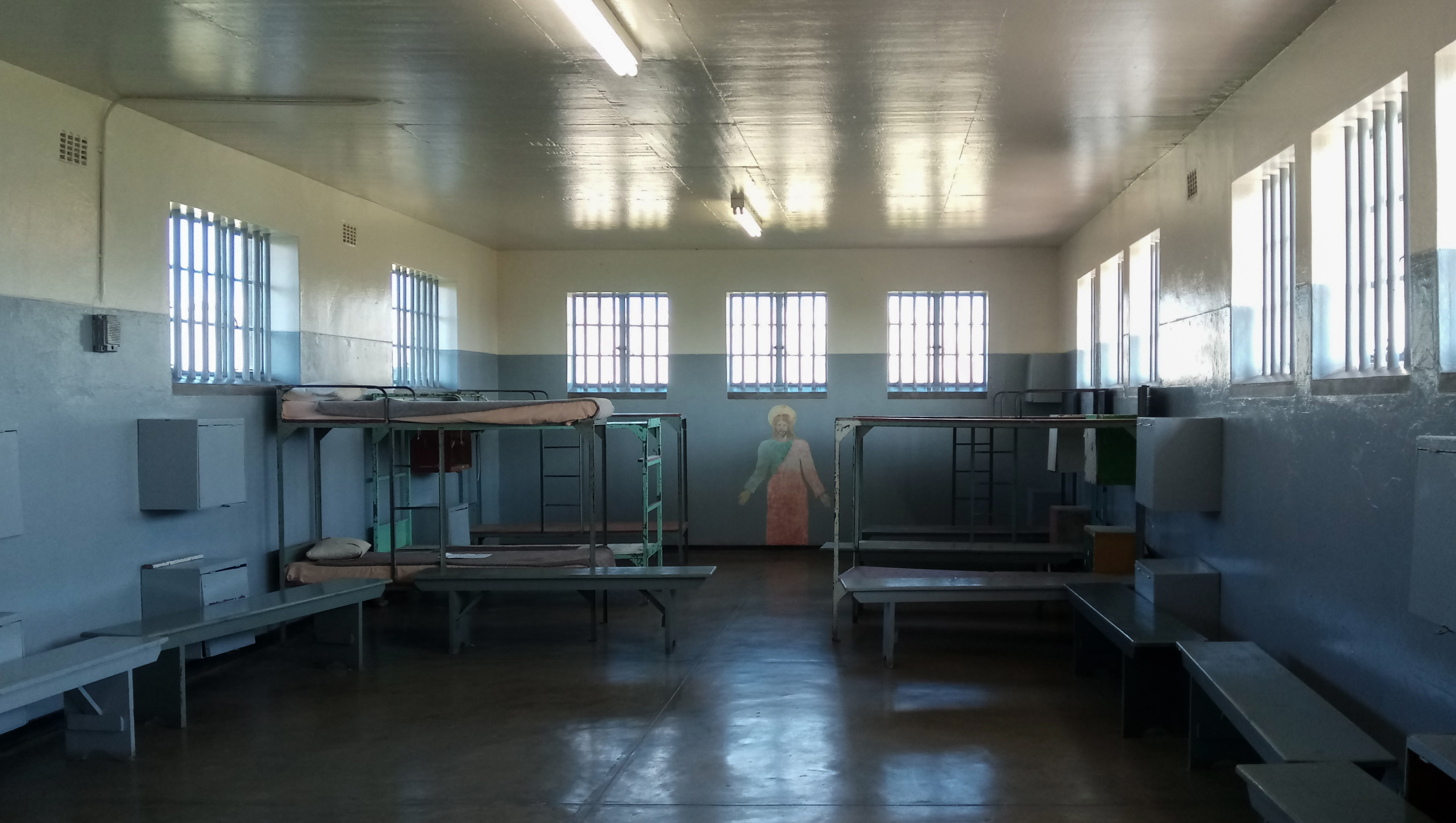
Dormitory

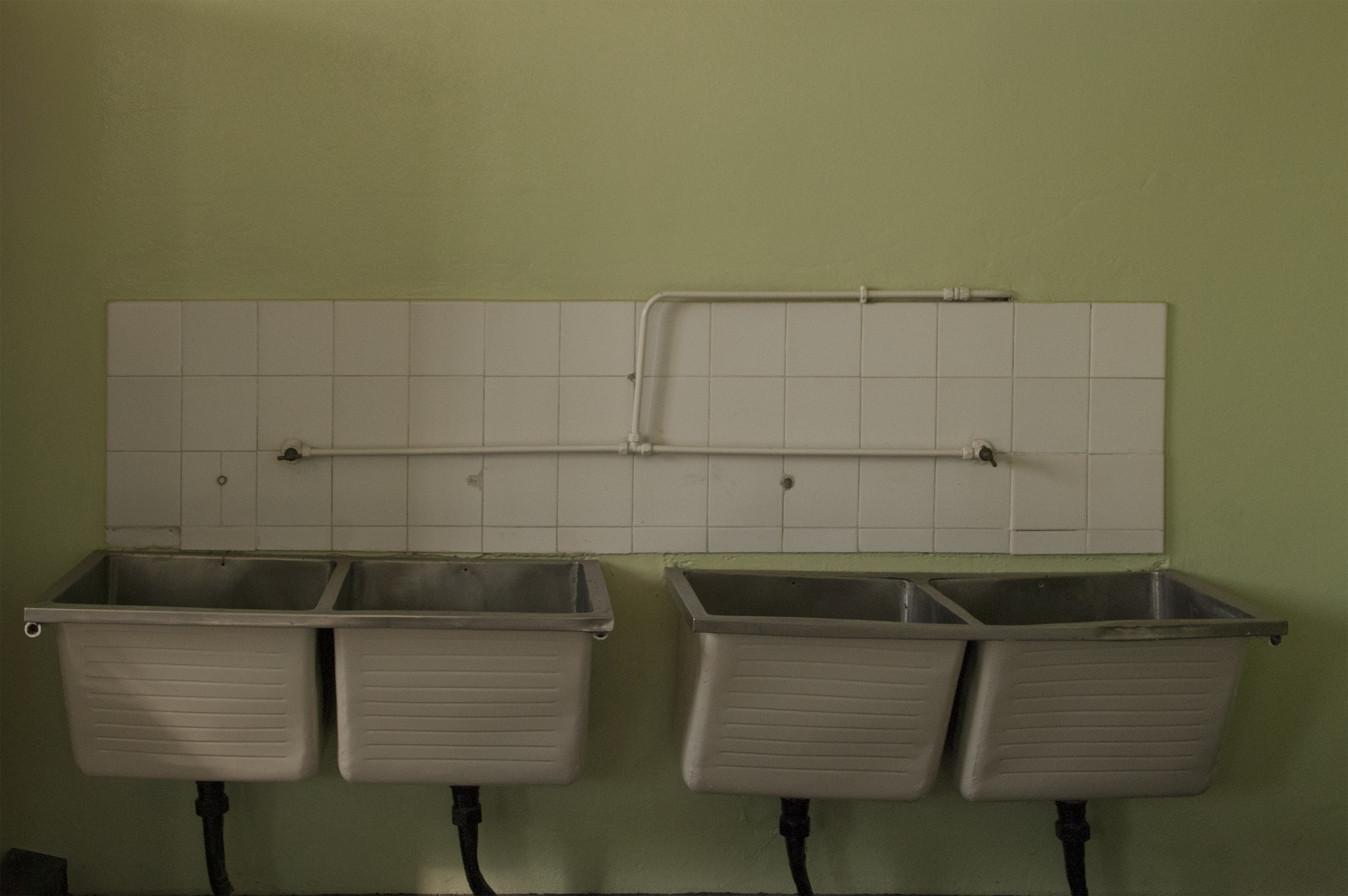
Wash basins

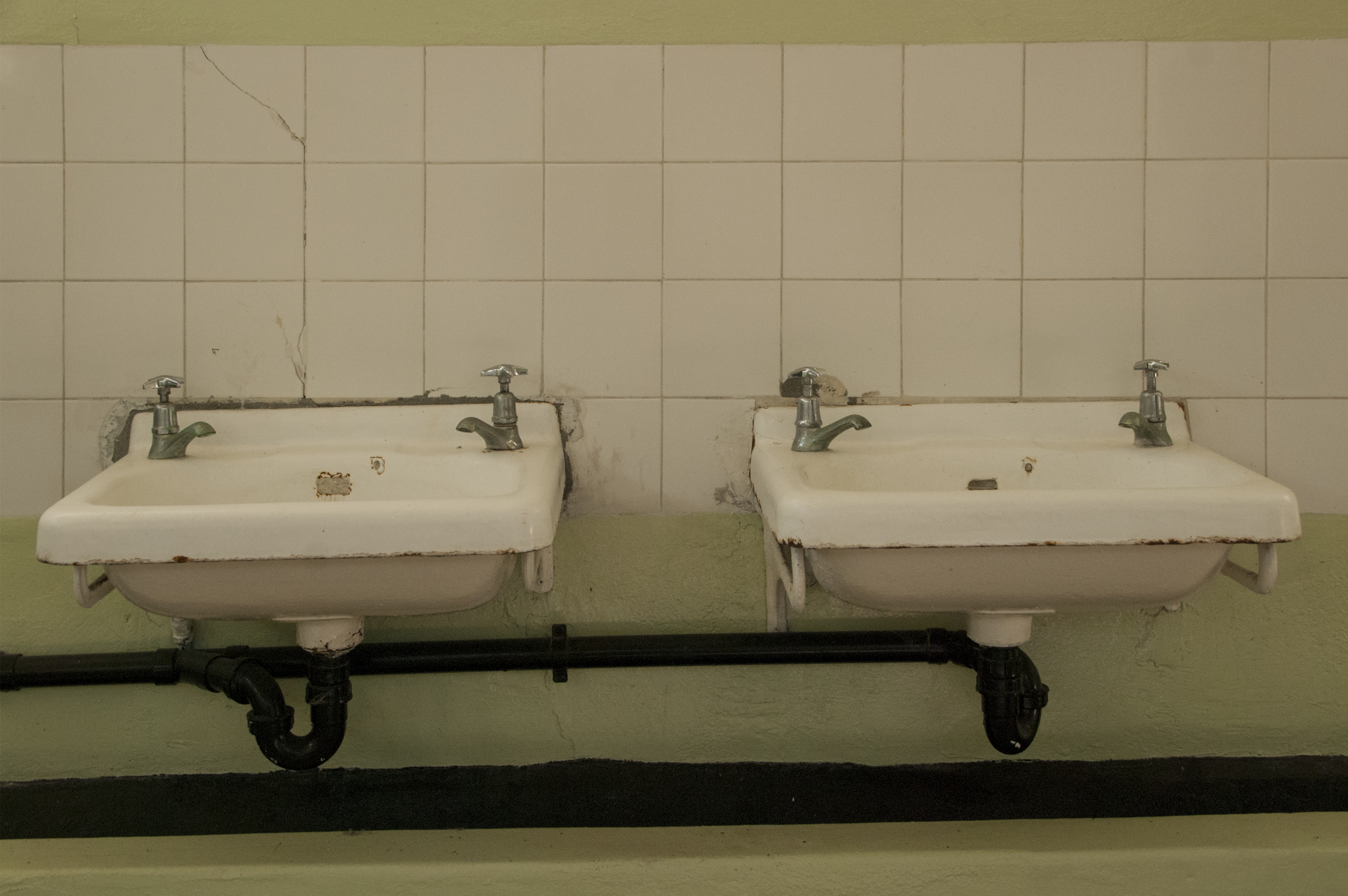
Wash basins

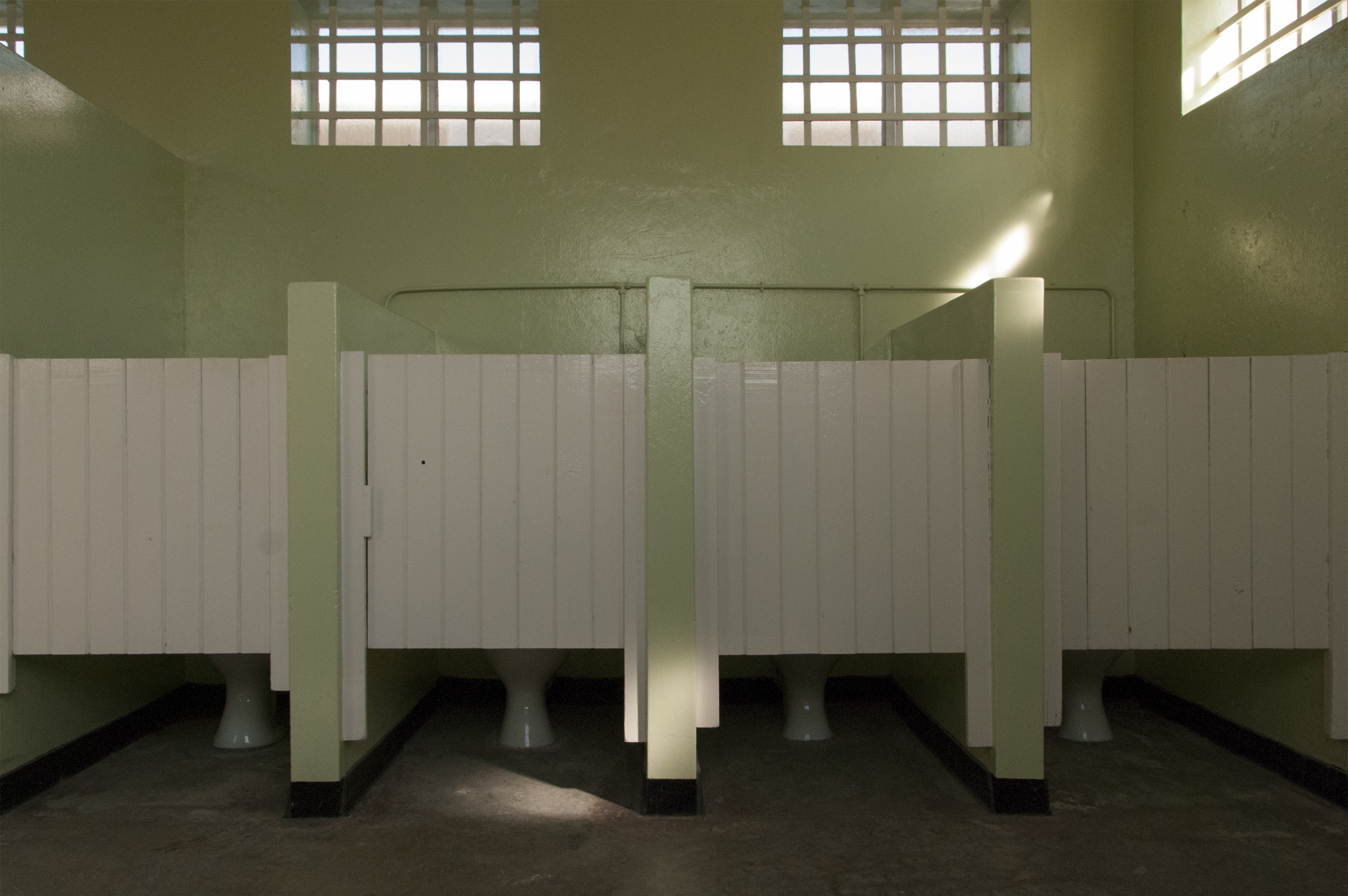
Communal toilets

== See also ==
- Makana F.A.
