= Motsoaledi =

Motsoaledi is a South African surname. Notable people with the surname include:

- Aaron Motsoaledi (born 1958), South African politician
- Elias Motsoaledi (1924–1994), South African activist
