= Jan Shoba =

Jan Shoba was a leader in the Azanian People's Liberation Army, the armed wing of the Pan Africanist Congress (PAC). He was a member of their High Command. In the late 1980s the military wing (APLA) of the PAC was disbanded and their focus became political and social issues.

Jan Shoba was arrested in 1984 and placed in Robben Island Prison. He managed to get the prison authorities to agree to a delivery of the Zimbabwean daily The Herald. He was thus able to supply the PAC on Robben Island with valuable information regarding political developments.

In 1990, following the negotiated Harare Declaration he was released from jail. He was placed in charge of party security, which may have played a part in his demise.

In a Truth and Reconciliation report it was stated that Jan Shoba trained members of the PAC in the use of firearms in June 1991. At the time the PAC developed the "Great Storm" operation, designed to instill fear in farmers.

Jan Shoba's possible involvement in the "Great Storm" could be the reason for his demise. He was assassinated outside his yard in Atteridgeville - his killers are still unknown.

In May 2012, Duncan Street in Pretoria was renamed Jan Shoba.
