= Little Rivonia Trial =

South African court case

The Little Rivonia Trial was a South African apartheid-era court case in which several members of the armed resistance organization Umkhonto we Sizwe faced charges of sabotage. The accused were: Laloo Chiba, Dave Kitson, Mac Maharaj, John Matthews and Wilton Mkwayi. A confederate of theirs, Lionel Gay turned state witness, and in return, the prosecution dropped the charges against him.

Judge W. G. Boshoff presided over the November to December 1964 trial, with human rights lawyer George Bizos one of the advocates appearing for the defence. All the accused were found guilty. Maharaj's legal representatives were expecting that he would receive the death penalty for his Central Committee membership of the South African Communist Party, a banned organization at the time. During the sentencing phase Mkwayi would simply say in his defence: "My Lord, I am a professional agitator". Mkwayi received a life sentence; Kitson twenty years; Chiba eighteen years; Matthews fifteen years and Maharaj twelve years. While Kitson and Matthews (both white), were imprisoned in Pretoria Central Prison and joined Denis Goldberg and for Mkwayi, Maharaj and Chiba joined Nelson Mandela, Govan Mbeki, Walter Sisulu, and other prominent African National Congress members for hard labour at the famous Robben Island quarry.

== The releases ==
- In 1976, Mac Maharaj was released from custody of Apartheid government after serving 12 years in the Robben Island prison.
- In 1979, John Matthews, a white South African Communist, was released after serving his 15 year sentence at Pretoria Central Prison. In 1997, years after his release, Matthews received three long service MK medals from then Deputy Minister of Defence, Ronnie Kasrils. Matthews eventually succumbed to cancer at the age of 85.
- In 1982, Laloo Chiba was released from custody of Apartheid government after serving 18 years in the Robben Island prison but he was rearrested in 1985 to 1986 without a trial.
- On 11 May 1984, Dave Kitson, a white British Communist who served in the High Command of uMkhonto weSizwe, was released after being in prison since 1964. He afterwards moved back to his native home of London, England. He later died in 2010.
- On 15 October 1989, Wilton Mkwayi was released from custody of Apartheid government after spending 25 years in Robben Island and Pollsmoor Prison; and his release which also included five Rivonia Trialists: Ahmed Kathrada, Raymond Mhlaba, Andrew Mlangeni, Elias Motsoaledi and Walter Sisulu after spending 26 years each, Oscar Mpetha after spending more than 6 years, and the co-founder and former leader of the Pan Africanist Congress Jafta Masemola after he also spent 27 years in prison.

== See also ==
- List of massacres in South Africa
- Rivonia Trial
- 1956 Treason Trial
- 1964 in South Africa

== Poems referencing apartheid ==
- "Nothing's Changed" by Tatamkhulu Afrika
- "Still Standing" by Athol Williams a.k.a. AE Ballakisten in Heap of Stones
- "Mandela and I" by Athol Williams a.k.a. AE Ballakisten in Heap of Stones
- "Leaders Great" by Mayihlome Tshwete
