= Nebo, South Africa =

Nebo
- Location within Limpopo Location within South Africa
- Coordinates: 24.9002°S 29.7669°E
- Country: South Africa
- Province: Limpopo
- District: Sekhukhune
- Municipality: Makhuduthamaga

Area
  - Total: 3.36 km^{2} (1.30 sq mi)

Population (2011)
  - Total: 3,390
  - Density: 1,010/km^{2} (2,610/sq mi)

Racial makeup (2011)
  - Black African: 99.9%
  - Other: 0.1%

First languages (2011)
  - Northern Sotho: 90.7%
  - Zulu: 3.1%
  - Swazi: 2.4%
  - S. Ndebele: 1.3%
  - Other: 2.6%
- Time zone: UTC+2 (SAST)
- PO box: 1059

Nebo is a town in Sekhukhune District Municipality in the Limpopo province of South Africa.

== Notable people ==
- Aaron Motsoaledi, Minister of Health, South Africa
- Caroline Motsoaledi, political activist
- Elias Motsoaledi, anti-apartheid activist, one of the eight men sentenced to life imprisonment at the Rivonia Trial
