= Samuel Sisulu =

South African anti-apartheid activist (1956–2003)

- Born: June 1956
- Died: June 2003 (aged 46–47)
- Spouse: Pinky Petunia Letsosa
- Father: Walter Sisulu

Samuel Sisulu (June 1956 - June 2003) was a South African anti-apartheid activist, Soweto uprising student leader and founder of South African Freedom Organisation (SAFO). He was jailed at various prisons including Robben Island in 1978, two years after the 1976 Soweto uprising. Samuel Sisulu was charged under the Terrorism Act. Reported in WIP 3. He was mentioned in the indictment of Paul Langa and found guilty of founding SAFO, attempting to cripple the economy of the country by bombing the apartheid government, inciting persons to persuade taxi drivers not to transport workers to place of work, aid strikes, unlawfully aid students in their fight against Bantu education and was also found guilty of recruiting people for military training.

Whilst in Robben Island, Samuel shared prison cells with his adopted father Walter Sisulu and Ahmed Kathrada (who became his daughter's godfather). Samuel Sisulu was later released from Robben Island in 1983, after serving 5 years. He married Pinky Pertunia Letsosa and continued to aid students and provide military training. Sisulu became instrumental in the 1994 election. He became a teacher and served under the new government.
