= Jeremy Vearey =

South African police officer

- Police career
- Department: South African Police Service
- Rank: Major-General

Major-General Jeremy Vearey is the Mitchells Plain cluster commander for the South African Police Service and head of police anti-gang unit in the Western Cape. He is best known for his work as the head of the province's anti-street gang unit and as Nelson Mandela's former bodyguard.

== Early life ==
Jeremy Vearey was born into a politically active family in Elsies River, Cape Town in apartheid South Africa where he first encountered the Black Consciousness movement and Marxism. Later in life his father went on to become one of the first African National Congress (ANC) alderman in the Theewaterskloof region of Genadendal.

== Political activism ==
Vearey was recruited into the armed wing of the ANC uMkhonto weSizwe in 1983. For a time in 1985 he taught in Elsies River that Neville Alexander was involved with at South African Council. He was arrested for his involvement in uMkhonto weSizwe operations in South Africa in 1987 and sent to the prison on Robben Island. Vearey was released from prison on 9 June 1990 after the un-banning of the ANC and beginning of the talks to end apartheid.

Once released from prison he was integrated into the ANC's intelligence structures where he served in both counter intelligence and as Nelson Mandela's bodyguard. His counter intelligence tasks ranged from preventing the infiltration of ANC structures and "counter destabilization of the ANC in the Western Cape through the use of street gangs."

== Police career ==
In the early 1990s whilst working for the ANC's intelligence branch he was sent on a number of policing training courses in the United Kingdom and Canada. After which he was deployed and integrated into the newly formed post-apartheid South African Police Service. Since joining the police Vearery has been a noted anti-gang expert in the Western Cape.

Major-General Vearey was fired in May 2021 after being found guilty of misconduct for "disrespectful" social media posts linking to media reports, allegedly aimed at National Police Commissioner Khehla Sitole. South African Communist Party provincial secretary Benson Ngqentsu said the dismissal had the hallmarks of an orchestrated, pernicious witch-hunt. The ANC in the Western Cape said of the firing that "This decision must be reversed".
