= Laloo Chiba =

South African politician (1930–2017)

Ishwarlal Laloo "Isu" Chiba (5 November 1930 – 8 December 2017) was a South African politician and revolutionary. He was arrested and sentenced at the Little Rivonia Trial in 1964 with Mac Maharaj and Wilton Mkwayi to join Nelson Mandela, Walter Sisulu, Govan Mbeki and other revolutionary prisoners on Robben Island.

== Early life ==
He was born to a Hindu family in Johannesburg. As a child he attended Bree Street Primary School and later Johannesburg Indian High School in Fordsburg. He married Luxmi in India on 5 May 1952. In the early 1950s, Chiba became friends with Ahmed Kathrada, Herbie Pillay and Bobby and Tommy Vassen, all members of the Transvaal Indian Youth Congress (TIYC).

== Revolutionary ==
Prior to the events in Sharpville, Chiba was an activist in the Transvaal Indian Congress in the late 1950s and the South African Communist Party in 1960. After the Sharpeville massacre in 1960, he concluded that peaceful protest had failed and military action was necessary, so he joined the ANC's armed wing, Umkhonto we Sizwe (MK) in 1961.

He was a platoon commander in 1962 and a member of the group's High Command by 1963. He was captured and tortured after a failed attempt to sabotage a railway line. He was arrested on the 6 July 1964 for sabotage. He and the rest of the group were sentenced as members of a banned organisation and sent to Robben Island. Released in 1982, he continued the work of the ANC as a member of the United Democratic Front. In 1983, he became one of the vice-presidents of the Transvaal Indian Congress. He was rearrested in July 1985 and released without a trial in March 1986, after which he went into hiding so he could continue his work for the ANC.

Upon the ANC's legalization in 1990, he became the president of its Lenasia branch. He was elected to South Africa's parliament in 1994 and 1999. In 2004 he was named a member of the Order of Luthuli in silver. He was a board member of the Ahmed Kathrada Foundation.

== Death ==
Chiba died on 8 December 2017. He is survived by wife Luxmi, three daughters - Gita, Kailash, and Yaswanti, seven grandchildren, and four great grandchildren. He was laid to rest on the following day at Avalon Cemetery.
