= South African Class 5E1, Series 3 =

Class of 100 South African electric locomotives

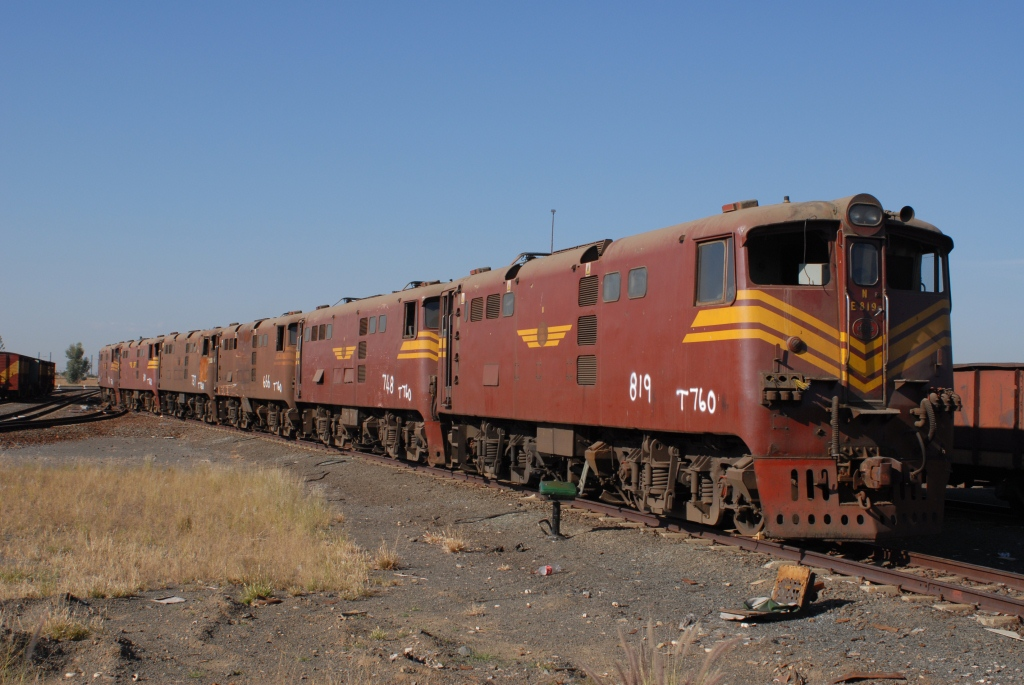
- No. E819 waiting to be cut up at Danskraal in Ladysmith, KwaZulu-Natal, 26 April 2007
Type and origin
- Designer: Metropolitan-Vickers
- Builder: Union Carriage & Wagon
- Model: MV 5E1
- Build date: 1964
- Total produced: 100
Specifications
- Configuration
  - AAR: B-B
  - UIC: Bo′Bo′
  - Commonwealth: Bo-Bo
- Gauge: 3 ft 6 in (1,067 mm) Cape gauge
- Wheel diameter: 1,220 mm (48.03 in)
- Wheelbase: 11,279 mm (37 ft 1/16 in)
  - Bogie: 3,430 mm (11 ft 3 1/16 in)
- Pivot centres: 7,849 mm (25 ft 9 in)
- Panto shoes: 6,972 mm (22 ft 10 1/2 in)
- Length
  - Over couplers: 15,494 mm (50 ft 10 in)
  - Over beams: 14,631 mm (48 ft 0 in)
- Width: 2,896 mm (9 ft 6 in)
- Height
  - Pantograph: 4,089 mm (13 ft 5 in)
  - Body height: 3,937 mm (12 ft 11 in)
- Axle load: 21,591 kg (47,600 lb)
- Adhesive weight: 86,364 kg (190,400 lb)
- Loco weight: 86,364 kg (190,400 lb)
- Electric system/s: 3 kV DC catenary
- Current pickup(s): Pantographs
- Traction motors: Four AEI 281 AZX
  - Rating 1 hour: 485 kW (650 hp)
  - Continuous: 364 kW (488 hp)
- Gear ratio: 18:67
- Loco brake: Air & Regenerative
- Train brakes: Vacuum
- Couplers: AAR knuckle
Performance figures
- Maximum speed: 97 km/h (60 mph)
- Power output
  - 1 hour: 1,940 kW (2,600 hp)
  - Continuous: 1,456 kW (1,953 hp)
- Tractive effort
  - Starting: 250 kN (56,000 lbf)
  - 1 hour: 184 kN (41,000 lbf)
  - Continuous: 122 kN (27,000 lbf) @ 40 km/h (25 mph)
Career
- Operators: South African Railways; Spoornet
- Class: Class 5E1
- Number in class: 100
- Numbers: E721-E820
- Delivered: 1964-1965
- First run: 1964

The South African Railways Class 5E1, Series 3 of 1964 was an electric locomotive.

In 1964 and 1965, the South African Railways placed one hundred Class 5E1, Series 3 electric locomotives with a Bo-Bo wheel arrangement in mainline service.

== Manufacturer ==
Series 3 of the Metropolitan-Vickers (Metrovick) designed 3 kV DC Class 5E1 electric locomotive was built for the South African Railways (SAR) in 1964 by Union Carriage & Wagon (UCW) in Nigel, with the electrical equipment being supplied by Associated Electrical Industries (AEI).

The Series 3 locomotives were delivered in 1964 and 1965, numbered in the range from E721 to E820. They were equipped with four AEI 281 AZX axle-hung traction motors fitted with tapered roller bearings. UCW did not allocate builder's numbers to the locomotives it built for the SAR and used the SAR unit numbers for their record keeping.

== Identifying features ==
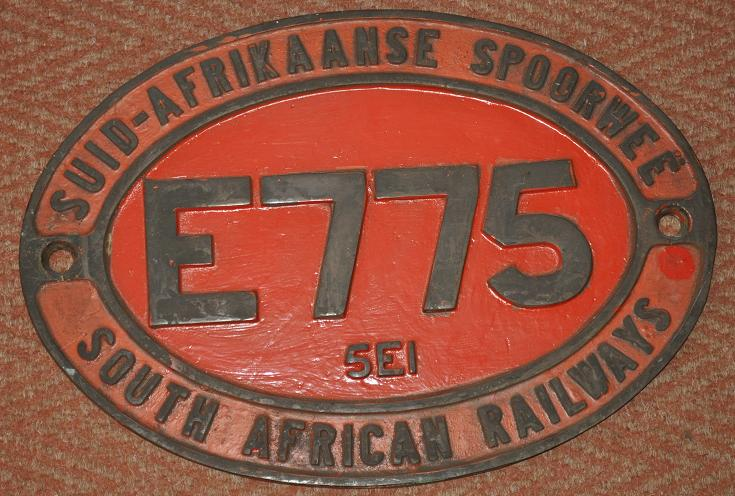
Builder's plate

The locomotive had two cut-outs on the roofline on the roof access ladder side, but an unbroken roofline on the opposite side. The Series 3, 4 and 5 locomotives could be visually distinguished from earlier series by their three small square access panels on the lower sides above the battery box instead of the two larger rectangular access panels on the Series 1 and 2 locomotives. Like the Series 2, the Series 3 also had an additional rectangular access panel on the lower sides above the second axle from the left.

== Traction motor bearings ==
Like the Series 2, the traction motors of the Series 3 were also equipped with roller-type suspension bearings. On the Series 2 locomotives the arrangement consisted of a self-aligning ball bearing at the pinion end and a parallel roller bearing at the commutator end of the traction motor. The bearings were grease-lubricated and were carried in a split cannon box to which the traction motor was attached by means of two clamps that engaged cylindrically-machined seatings on the outside of the housing. The roller-type suspension bearings required little attention other than the replenishment of the grease when the wheels were removed for tyre-turning.

When orders were placed for the Series 3 and later models, the specifications made provision for roller suspension bearings incorporating a lip-type cylindrical roller bearing to replace the self-aligning ball bearing at the pinion end, and alternatively for tapered roller bearings at both ends. Since the external dimensions of the bearing-housings would remain the same, the traction motors were still freely interchangeable.

== Headlamps ==
In the 1970s most serving SAR steam and electric locomotives had their original large round headlamps replaced by less attractive but more efficient double sealed-beam automobile headlamps. On Series 3, 4 and 5 units, the original round headlamp housing was retained and the glass was replaced by a metal disk containing the sealed beam headlamps.

== Service ==
The Class 5E1 family served on all 3 kV DC electrified mainlines country-wide for almost forty years. They worked the vacuum-braked goods and mainline passenger trains over the lines radiating south, west and north of Durban almost exclusively until the mid-1970s and Class 6E1s only became regular motive power in Natal when air-braked car trains began running between Durban and the Reef. By the early 2000s the Series 3 locomotives were all withdrawn. None are known to have survived.

== Livery ==
The whole series was delivered in the Gulf Red livery with signal red cowcatchers, yellow whiskers, full body-length side-stripes and with the number plates on the sides enclosed in three-stripe wings. In the 1970s the side-stripes were curtailed to just beyond the cab-sides, but with the number plates on the sides still enclosed in three-stripe wings.

== Illustration ==
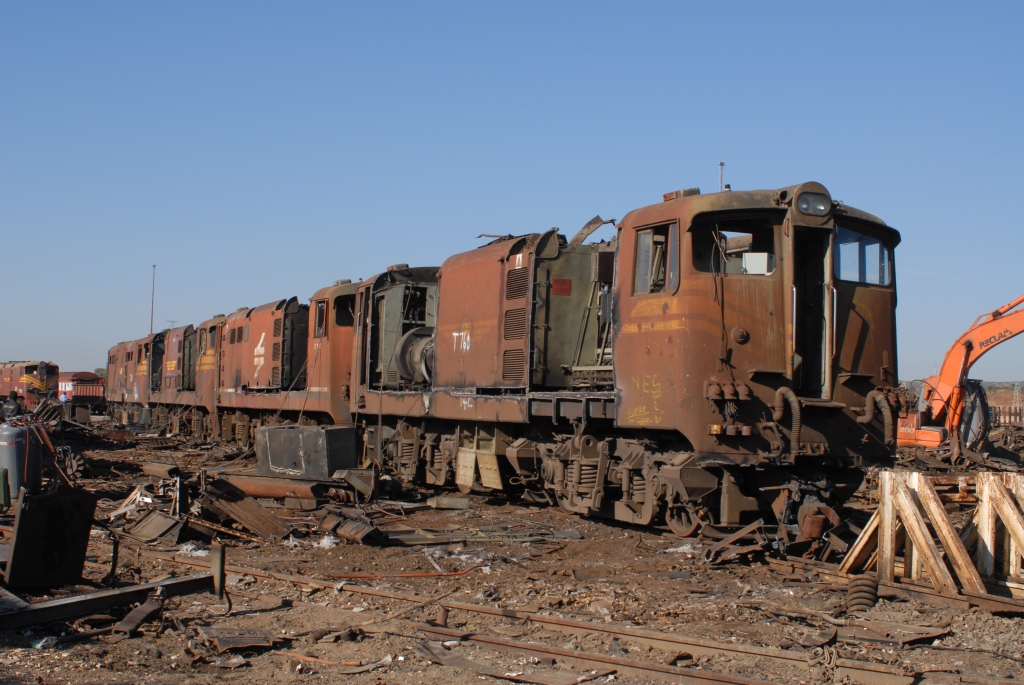
No. E742 being cut up at Danskraal, Ladysmith, 26 April 2007
