= Elias Motsoaledi =

South African activist (1924–1994)

Elias Mathope Motsoaledi OMSG (26 July 1924 – 9 May 1994) was a South African anti-apartheid activist. He was Accused No.9 in the Rivonia Trial and was sentenced to life imprisonment in July 1963 with a group of anti-Apartheid revolutionaries which included Nelson Mandela who was Accused No.1.

== Early life ==
Elias Motsoaledi was born on 26 July 1924, the third of eight children, in Phokoane in the Nebo District in Sekhukuneland, now Limpopo. He moved to Johannesburg at the age of 17 in search of work. His first brush with the law in Johannesburg was his arrest for failure to produce his pass book, and he was sentenced to work on the construction of a road in Pretoria.

Upon his release he got a job in a furniture factory.

== Activism ==
=== Trade union movement ===
Motsoaledi joined the Communist Party of South Africa (CPSA) in 1945 and then the African National Congress (ANC) in 1948. He soon became involved with trade unions. He joined the Leather Workers' Union in 1949, served as chairman of the Committee of Non-European Trade Unions (CNETU), which was formed in 1941. He was elected chairperson of CNETU in 1953. later played an active role in the establishment of the South African Congress of Trade Unions (COSATU).

=== ANC and SACP ===
A lifelong member of the South African Communist Party and the African National Congress (ANC), he played a central role in many campaigns, including the Defiance Campaign of 1952, the year he was first banned. He joined the ANC in 1948, and in June he was elected as a branch secretary. Detained during the 1960 State of Emergency, he was imprisoned for four months. When he was released, he went underground and worked for Umkhonto we Sizwe by joining it in 1962.

=== Arrest and imprisonment ===
In July 1963, he was arrested at Liliesleaf Farm along with Walter Sisulu, Govan Mbeki, Ahmed Kathrada, Denis Goldberg, Raymond Mhlaba, and Andrew Mlangeni. At the Rivonia Trial, all of the men and Nelson Mandela (who had been imprisoned earlier) were found guilty and sentenced to life imprisonment.

After 26 years on Robben Island and Pollsmoor Prison, Motsoaledi was released from prison on 15 October 1989 along with four others who were Sisulu, Mlangeni, Mhlaba and Kathrada; also together with Wilton Mkwayi, who had been incarcerated for 25 years after being convicted in the Little Rivonia Trial; Oscar Mpetha, imprisoned for more than 6 years; and co-founder and former leader of the Pan Africanist Congress Jafta Masemola after he had been imprisoned for 27 years. During the July 1991 National Conference, Motsoaledi was elected to the National Executive Committee (NEC) of the ANC.

== Personal life ==
He married Caroline Motsoaledi and they had seven children.

He was paternal uncle to South African politician and minister Aaron Motsoaledi.

== Recognition ==
Motsoaledi received an Isitwalandwe Medal on 8 January 1992 along with Oliver Tambo, Nelson Mandela, Walter Sisulu, Helen Joseph, Ahmed Kathrada, Harry Gwala, Andrew Mlangeni, Raymond Mhlaba, and Wilton Mkwayi.

The Elias Motsoaledi Local Municipality in Limpopo province was named after him.

== Death and legacy ==
He died on 9 May 1994, aged 69, the day before Mandela was inaugurated as the President of South Africa.

At Mostoaledi's funeral, Mandela spoke of him as follows:

We began our political careers as members of the ANCYL and comrade Motsoaledi was a member of the Communist Party of SA as it was then known. As the YL we were fiercely nationalistic in our approach and anti-White, anti-Indian and anti-Communist. We had many clashes in which he criticized us and at times attacked us viciously for what he considered very conservative and reactionary views.

But in that debate we learnt a great deal because when you debate issues of that nature if you approach that debate with seriousness and earnesty. At the end of the debate you find yourself closer to your rivals than you were before that debate.

Even during that time when we accepted the Communist Party of SA was committed to the very ideas to which the ANC and Democratic Movement in this country was fighting was established to achieve, Cde Motsoaledi was one of those members of the Democratic Movement who was non-conformist. He did not find it easy to agree with ideas unless he has considered them seriously and carefully. Comrades and friends, that has been and still is the strength of our movement.
