= Mac Maharaj =

South African politician (born 1935)

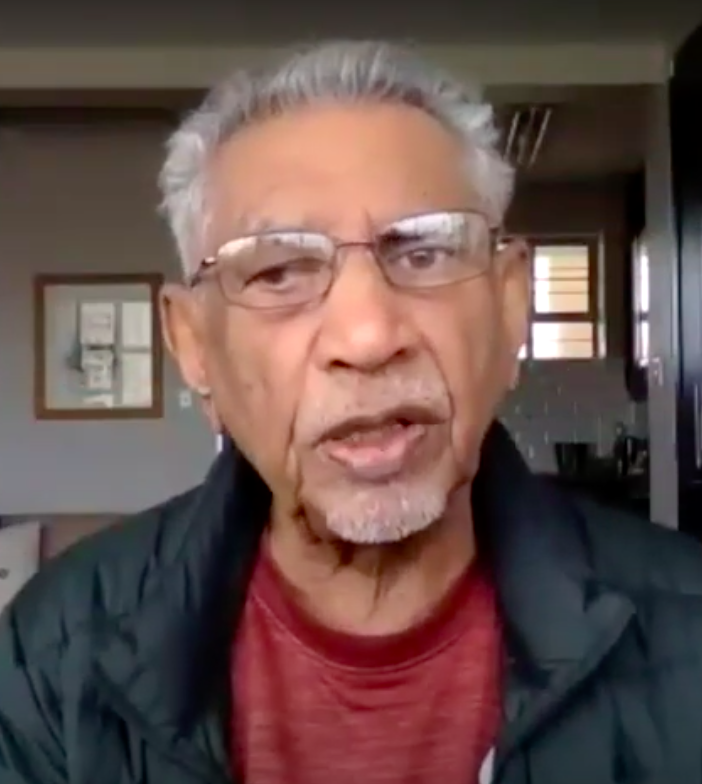
- Maharaj in 2021

Minister of Transport
- In office 11 May 1994 – 1999
- President: Nelson Mandela
- Preceded by: Piet Welgemoed
- Succeeded by: Dullah Omar

Personal details
- Born: Sathyandranath Ragunanan Maharaj; 22 April 1935 (age 91) Newcastle, Natal, Union of South Africa
- Party: African National Congress
- Other political affiliations: South African Communist Party

Sathyandranath Ragunanan "Mac" Maharaj OLS (born 22 April 1935 in Newcastle, Natal) is a retired South African-Indian politician, businessman, and former anti-apartheid activist. A member of the African National Congress (ANC), he was the first post-apartheid minister of transport from 1994 to 1999. He was later the official spokesperson to the president of South Africa, Jacob Zuma.

== Education ==
Maharaj matriculated at St. Oswald's High School in Newcastle in 1952. After graduating, he enrolled in a BA in psychology and Native administration at the University of Natal in Durban, which he graduated from in 1955 at the age of 20. After earning his BA, he remained in Natal for another year studying to receive his LLB as in 1956 the university had added a "Non-European" section to their law school, but it closed down only a year later.

While at the university, Maharaj was involved in student government and activism. He served on the Students' Representative Council, campaigned against segregation of students and boycotted the racially divided graduation ceremonies. He also edited the Student Call newspaper, which gave him some experience in journalism. After the 1956 Treason Trial, Maharaj was asked to run the leftist New Age (South African newspaper) as many of the former members had been arrested, including Nelson Mandela.

Maharaj, unable to obtain a permit to continue to study law in South Africa, moved to the UK in 1957. He eventually enrolled to continue his LLB at the London School of Economics in 1959 as a part-time student. Already a leftist and involved in politics, Maharaj joined the British Communist Party, and during this time it is reported that Maharaj went to East Germany under the alias Das Gupta and received military training from alleged South African-aligned Soviets. The official reason that he went to Germany was to gain experience with "printing techniques", but he also received training in sabotage and specifically dynamite. Maharaj returned to the SACP as something of a publishing director, as well as bomb maker, in the early 1960s.

== Anti-apartheid activism ==
Maharaj was a political activist and member of the then banned South African Communist Party, who worked in a clandestine manner on anti-apartheid activities with Nelson Mandela. In July 1964, Maharaj was arrested in Johannesburg, charged and convicted with four others, including Laloo Chiba and Wilton Mkwayi on charges of sabotage in the little Rivonia Trial, and was imprisoned on Robben Island with Mandela, Walter Sisulu, Govan Mbeki and other revolutionary prisoners. In prison he secretly transcribed parts of Mandela's memoir Long Walk to Freedom and smuggled it out of the prison in 1976.

During his time in prison, Maharaj completed a BAdmin, an MBA and the second year of a BSc degree before his release on 8 December 1976.

After being released from the Robben Island prison in 1976, Maharaj was deployed by the ANC to Zambia in 1977. He was elected to the national executive committee of the ANC in 1985 as the first non-African member. From 1988 to 1990 Maharaj worked underground in South Africa as part of the ANC's Operation Vula, which was a project to infiltrate the ANC's top leaders back into South Africa. During this time Maharaj worked with Schabir Shaik's two brothers, Yunis Shaik and Moe Shaik, also members of the ANC. Maharaj reported to the then ANC intelligence chief Jacob Zuma.

== Role in government ==
He was appointed South Africa's new minister of transport on 11 May 1994, a post he kept until the general election of 1999.

On 6 July 2011 he was appointed by President Jacob Zuma as his spokesperson with immediate effect.

== Private sector ==
After the national elections of 1999, Mac Maharaj stepped down from politics, then joined FirstRand Bank as its highest-paid non-executive director.

== Controversies ==
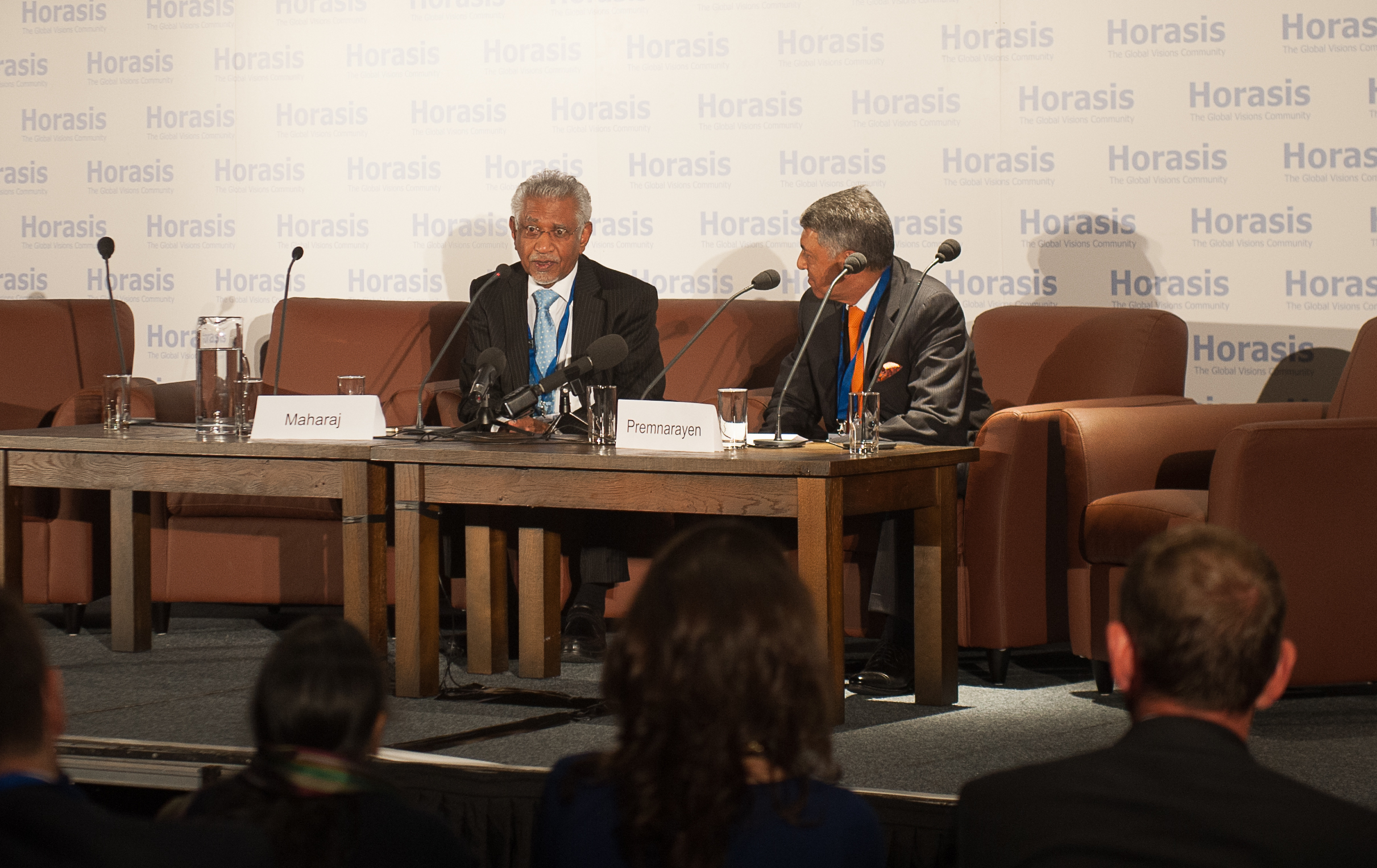
Maharaj (left) in 2014

In February 2003 the South African newspaper, The Sunday Times, published allegations that Mac Maharaj and his wife Zarina had received more than R500,000 between May 1998 and February 1999 from a businessman, Schabir Shaik, who had shared in two multi-million-rand contracts awarded by the Ministry of Transport whilst Maharaj was Minister. In August 2003 Maharaj resigned from FirstRand Bank following the media furor around the allegations of corruption.

In March 2007 the South African newspaper, City Press, published allegations that Maharaj's wife Zarina opened a Swiss bank account in 1996, and two days after opening it, received over $100,000 into the account from Schabir Shaik. Six months later, in March 1997, the same Swiss account received a further $100,000 from Schabir Shaik.

In November 2011 the South African newspaper Mail & Guardian attempted to publish further allegations about both Mac and Zarina Maharaj, in relation to their interviews by prosecutors in 2003, but did not do so after Mac Maharaj laid criminal charges against the newspaper for allegedly infringing the laws protecting the secrecy of the 2003 prosecutor interviews.

Maharaj has never been charged by South African prosecutors supposedly because it would have been difficult to prove that Maharaj had corrupt intentions when he and his wife received money from Schabir Shaik.

== Academic affiliations ==
In 2005, he joined the faculty of Bennington College in Vermont, US.

== Quotes ==
- "You don't have to carry a gun to be a freedom fighter."
- "Revenge should not be our motivation."
