= Wilton Mkwayi =

African National Congress veteran

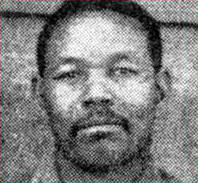

Overall Commander of uMkhonto we Sizwe
- In office 1963–1964
- President: Oliver Tambo
- Preceded by: Raymond Mhlaba
- Succeeded by: Joe Modise

Personal details
- Born: Wilton Zimasile Mkwayi; 17 December 1923 Chwarhu, Middledrift, South Africa
- Died: 24 July 2004 (aged 80)
- Party: African National Congress; South African Communist Party
- Spouses: Ntombifuthi Irene Mhlongo (m. 1985; died 1987) Patricia Lang (m. 1996)

Wilton Zimasile Mkwayi OMSG (17 December 1923 – 24 July 2004) was an African National Congress veteran and one of the first six members of Umkonto weSizwe to be sent for military training.

== Early life ==
Wilton “Bri-Bri” Zimasile Mkwayi was born in Chwarhu area near Middledrift in 1923. His parents were uneducated farmers. He was one of seven children. Mkwayi started school at age ten in a Presbyterian church building in Keiskammahoek. He had a rural childhood herding sheep and goats, and passing through circumcision school.

Mkwayi became a member of the ANC at age 17, after his father, also a member of the ANC, gave him a membership card. He left school in 1943, while World War 2 was ongoing, to work at a dynamite factory in Somerset West. Mkwayi left Somerset West for Port Elizabeth in 1945 to work offloading large trucks and trains; he also worked at the docks.

== Political career ==
On 1 May 1950, he participated in the ANC Youth League’s one-day general strike and stay away across South Africa. He was a leader of the 1952 Defiance Campaign in the Eastern Cape. He was also union organiser for the Southern African Textile Workers Union in Port Elizabeth in the early 1950s. He worked as treasurer of the South African Congress of Trade Unions (SACTU). He was arrested after the Defiance Campaign for a metal workers' strike and escaped with a fine.

Mkwayi was one of the 156 co-accused in the 1956 Treason Trial for supporting the Freedom Charter calling for a non-racial democracy and a Socialist-based economy.

Mkwayi went into hiding during the trial and the 1960 State of Emergency while the other defendants were detained, later arrested and tried during the Rivonia Trial. He was able to escape because a policeman mistook him for an ordinary member of the public. He started his exile in Lesotho with Moses Mabhida, Ambrose Makiwane and Joe Matthews. From Lesotho he journeyed to Swaziland, Congo, Ghana and the UK to meet the British Trades Union Congress (TUC). The TUC funded his travels to Prague, Romania and Czechoslovakia to establish contacts for the SACTU.

Alongside Raymond Mhlaba, Patrick Mthembu and Joe Gqabi, Wilton Mkwayi was sent for military training at the Nanking Military School in China. He met Mao Tse-tung while in China. They were the first Umkonto weSizwe trainees.

He returned to Britain after his training where he met Oliver Tambo. He returned clandestinely to South Africa in 1962 to work underground and lead sabotage operations such as Operation Mayibuye. His most documented disguise was a clerical collar that allowed him to pass for a township preacher.

After Govan Mbeki, Raymond Mhlaba, Walter Sisulu and other co-defendants were arrested on 11 July 1963 and Nelson Mandela was already in prison, Mkwayi briefly took command of Umkonto weSizwe. He was arrested at his girlfriend’s house in Orlando West in 1964, after he was informed upon by a mole within the ANC. He was detained in solitary confinement and subjected to torture while awaiting trial.

Mkwayi was charged with Sabotage and Suppression of Communism Acts, with furthering the aims of communism and conspiring to bring about a violent revolution, allegedly as a member of the new High Command of Umkhonto we Sizwe. He was sentenced in December 1964 in the little Rivonia Trial and sent to Robben Island, where he met Nelson Mandela and Govan Mbeki. During his imprisonment, he was one of three prisoners – along with Mandela and Mac Maharaj – planning to escape during a visit to a dentist in Cape Town. They called their escape plan off when they suspected a police trap setting them up for assassination.

Mkwayi was released from Robben Island on 15 October 1989. In 1992, he was honoured with the ANC’s highest award, Isitwalandwe Medal (““the one who wears the plumes of the rare bird.”) awarded to those who have made an outstanding contribution and sacrifice to the liberation struggle.

He was elected to the National Executive Committee of the ANC in July 1991 and he continued to serve until 1997, when he stepped down due to his ill health. From 1994, he served as a member of the National Assembly, continuing to serve as an MP until his death on 24 July 2004.

His funeral was held in King William's Town and attended by Phumzile Mlambo-Ngcuka. His cremation was attended by Thabo Mbeki.

== Personal life ==
In 1985, in a Robben Island Prison Ceremony, he married his childhood sweetheart Ntombifuthi Irene Mhlongo and they had two children. She died of cancer in 1987. He married a second time and his wife Patricia Lang-Mkwayi survived him.

== See also ==
- Treason Trial
- Liliesleaf Farm
