= Tryphina Mboxela Jokweni =

Tryphina Mboxela Jokweni was a female operative of Umkhonto we Sizwe (MK), an armed military wing of the African National Congress (ANC). The ANC is currently the governing party in South Africa. She was popularly known as Mboxela in the neighbourhood.

She died of illness at her house at Umlazi Township in the KwaZulu-Natal (KZN) Province at the age of 77 in 2002. Mboxela was the mother of three children.

== Early life ==
In 1951, Mboxela was recruited to the ANC by Dorothy Nyembe, both women being residents of the informal settlement of Umkhumbane. Mboxela served the MK and ANC with loyalty and dedication over the years. While at Umkhumbane she worked as an ANC volunteer and regularly distributed informative pamphlets to the public (with the assistance of Dorothy Nyembe and Steve Dlamini) about ANC policies in order to drum up support for the ANC at the time.

== Timeline ==
Mboxela took part in the historic 1956 Women's March to the Union Buildings against pass laws. Participation in this march was one of the factors that influenced her in subsequently joining Umkhonto we Sizwe in 1962 under the command of Billy Nair. She served in the MK alongside cadres such as Curnick Ndlovu. Joining the MK made her the target of the apartheid security police. Consequently, she fled temporarily to Transkei to avoid arrest. On her return to KwaZulu-Natal (KZN) she was captured by the apartheid police in 1966 and spent the next six months in prison.

She probably moved to Umlazi Township in 1967 following the demolition of Umkhumbane informal settlement by the apartheid government. Mboxela used her house at Umlazi Township as a safehouse for MK cadres who were operating in Durban and others areas of the country.

In 1983, Mboxela together with Victoria Mxenge formed a Women's League which was affiliated to the United Democratic Front (UDF). The league was chaired by Nozizwe Madlala-Routledge.

In April 1993, she was a VIP at the funeral of Chris Hani, the former commander of MK, and former secretary general of the South African Communist Party (SACP).

In January 1993, Siphiwe Mvuyane, a police oficer notorious for killing ANC activists, allegedly came to Mboxela's house looking for her but she was not around. On learning about Mvuyane's visit, Mboxela fled Umlazi Township and proceeded to Clermont Township. Mboxela returned to her house after Mvuyane died in May 1993.

== 1987 bombing ==
On the evening of April 23, 1987 three MK operatives travelled to Mboxela's house. Unbeknown to them, they were under surveillance from the apartheid intelligence. At midnight, Mboxela's house was surrounded by members of the South African Defence Force (SADF) and South African Police (SAP). Crossfire ensued between the three MK operatives and the apartheid security force. The fighting went on into the early hours of April 24.

The three MK operatives were given a final chance to come out of the house, which they refused. The apartheid security force then bombed the house, reducing it to rubble and killing the three MK operatives. Mboxela survived because she had left the house when the final offer was made, handing herself over to the police. For this incident, Mboxela was arrested and detained for nine months in prison, where she endured torture, including electrocution, from the apartheid police in Amanzimtoti. After her release, she told community members that the young white men who electrocuted her in the genitals would never see the Kingdom of God. She quipped: "How dare can they touch and force open genitals of a person of my age? I am a mother to these young white men".

After her release from prison, her neighbour, David Majola, who ran a construction business, built Mboxela a shack pro bono in her yard next to her destroyed house. She stayed at this shack for many years until the ANC re-constructed her house after the 1994 democratic elections. The ANC had become the governing party in South Africa after 1994.

== Views on education ==
Mboxela admired young people who were furthering their studies. She believed that the new generation would only realize the hard earned freedom if they got themselves educated. She personally lamented the fact that she could not (after the dawn of democracy) rise to senior positions in the ANC and in the eThekwini Metropolitan Municipality Council because she lacked the requisite knowledge and skills as a result of poor education she had.

== Legacy ==
She was commemorated by the ANC on August 29, 2012. A cow donated by the ANC was slaughtered at her house as a ritual in her remembrance. She is laid to rest at Wentworth Cemetery. In commemoration of Mboxela, the spokesperson of the ANC, Mtholephi Mthimkhulu, said: "The spirit of Jokweni should lead us to step up the fight against poverty to ensure a better life for all."

== See also ==
- Andrew Zondo
- Solomon Mahlangu
- Umkhonto we Sizwe
- Siphiwe Mvuyane
