= Solomon Mahlangu =

South African anti-apartheid activist (1956–1979)

Solomon Kalushi Mahlangu
- Mahlangu's mugshot (1977)
- Born: 10 July 1956; Mamelodi, Pretoria, Transvaal, Union of South Africa
- Died: 6 April 1979 (aged 22); Pretoria Central Prison, Pretoria, South Africa
- Cause of death: Execution by hanging
- Resting place: Mamelodi, Pretoria
- Occupations: Student, guerrilla
- Organization(s): ANC, uMkhonto weSizwe
- Parent: Martha Mahlangu
- Awards: Order of Mendi for Bravery (posthumously) (2005)

Solomon Kalushi Mahlangu (10 July 1956 – 6 April 1979) was a South African anti-apartheid activist and operative of the African National Congress (ANC) militant wing, uMkhonto weSizwe (MK). He was convicted for his part in the murder of two people and hanged in 1979.

== Early years ==
Mahlangu was born on 10 July 1956. Although often said to have been born in Pretoria, a Mahlangu family spokesperson later corrected his birthplace to Doornkop in what is now Mpumalanga.

Mahlangu was the second of six children. He was primarily raised by his mother, Martha Mahlangu who worked as a domestic worker, as his father largely abandoned the family in 1962.

Mahlangu attended Mamelodi High School up to Standard 9. He was in Standard 8 during the 1976 Soweto uprisings of student-led protests against Bantu Education. His school was closed due to ongoing riots.

== Military training ==
In 1976, Mahlangu flew to Mozambique and spent six months in a refugee camp near Xai Xai. From there he was taken to an African National Congress training camp called "Engineering" in Angola. He was part of a group of MK trainees called the "June 16 Detachment" due to their involvement in the 1976 student protests.

Mahlangu joined a unit of ten men at Funda Camp who received training in sabotage, military combat, scouting and politics.

== Arrest ==
After months of paramilitary training, Mahlangu's unit travelled to Swaziland, where they were given false-bottom suitcases containing ANC pamphlets, guns, ammunition and explosives. On 11 June 1977, Mahlangu and fellow trainees George 'Lucky' Mahlangu and Mondy Motaung (sometimes "Motloung") formed a smaller cell that crossed the border into South Africa and started making their way to Johannesburg with the intention to join protests commemorating the June 16 Uprising.

On 13 June 1977, the three men, each carrying a large suitcase, were at the taxi rank in central Johannesburg on their way to Soweto when a policeman became suspicious and grabbed one of the suitcases. An AK-47 assault rifle and hand grenade fell out. All three men attempted to flee the area and escape the policemen. Solomon Mahlangu and Motaung unknowingly fled in the direction of the police station in John Vorster Square. Mahlangu was shot in the ankle and the pair fled into a nearby warehouse. In the ensuing confusion, Motaung shot and killed two warehouse employees, Rupert Kessner and Kenneth Wolfendale, and wounded another two people. Mahlangu and Motaung were arrested while George 'Lucky' Mahlangu evaded capture.

== Trial and sentence ==
Mahlangu's trial started in the Supreme Court of South Africa on 7 November 1977. His defence team included Ismail Mohamed, S.C., Clifford Mailer and Priscilla Jana. Mahlangu faced two counts of murder, two counts of attempted murder and various counts of sabotage under the Terrorism Act of 1967.

Although Mahlangu had not fired the shots that killed two civilians, the court found that Mahlangu and Motaung had acted with a common purpose and that it consequently did not matter which of the two had done the shooting and killing. Mahlangu was convicted on all counts, while Motaung had been so severely beaten by police while in detention that he suffered brain injuries and was declared unfit to stand trial.

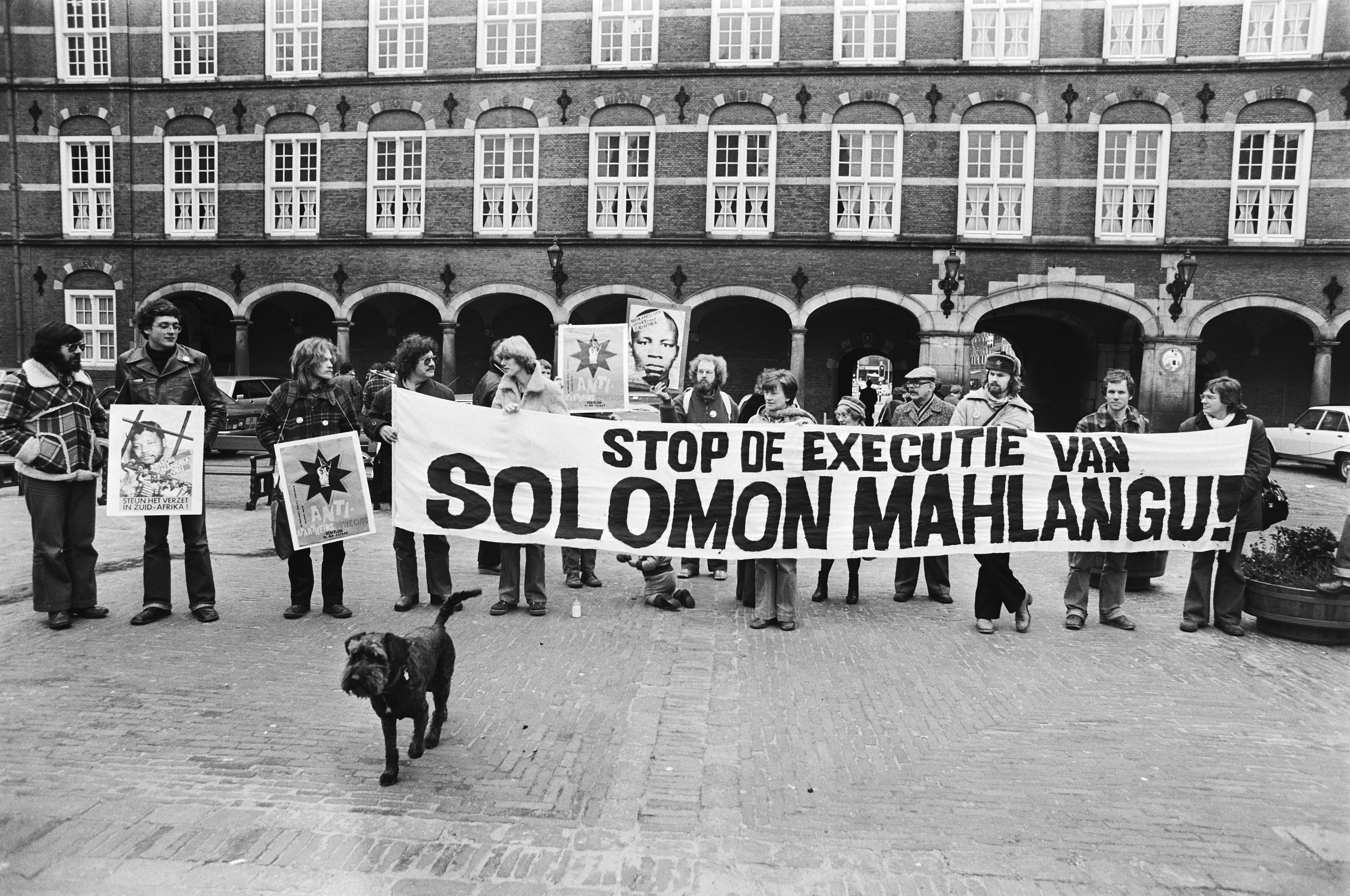
International protestors at The Hague holding a banner reading "Stop the execution of Solomon Mahlangu" in Dutch from the day before his execution.

In terms of South African law at the time, the court was obliged to sentence someone convicted for murder to death unless the accused proved mitigating circumstances. The court found that Mahlangu had failed to do so, and consequently handed down the death sentence. The court refused Mahlangu's leave to appeal. His lawyers then asked the Court of Appeal of South Africa for leave to appeal and this too was refused.

Mahlangu was hanged on 6 April 1979. Priscilla Jana was the last of his supporters to see him before his execution and shared his final message: "Tell my people that I love them. They must continue the fight. My blood will nourish the tree that will bear the fruits of freedom." He was one of 133 people executed by the state in that year.

With unprecedented international condemnation of the then-South African Government and to stop protest at his funeral, police buried Mahlangu in Atteridgeville. In 1993, his remains were reinterred in the Mamelodi Cemetery with a plaque bearing his final words.

== Truth and Reconciliation Commission ==
South Africa's post-apartheid Truth and Reconciliation Commission examined the cases of Solomon Mahlangu and Monty Motaung and found that both men were responsible for the deaths of Rupert Kessner and Kenneth Wolfendale. It also found both Mahlangu and Motaung guilty of gross human rights violations. Lastly it found both the African National Congress and the commanding officer of uMkhonto weSizwe guilty of gross human rights violations.

Mahlangu's mother testified before the Truth and Reconciliation Commission that she had been unaware of her son's interest in politics and had not been told of his decision to leave the country for military training, only receiving a message to tell her to not look for her son. She later visited him in detention at John Vorster Square. His last note to her was:

Mama, thank you for having been strong to come and visit me and not cry. But where my blood will drop, so many Solomons will grow up because I am innocent.

== Legacy ==
Solomon Mahlangu is commemorated in the Solomon Mahlangu Freedom Square in his hometown of Mamelodi, Pretoria. The square is focused on a bronze statue of Mahlangu wearing MK camouflage and incorporating children's depictions of "fruits of freedom".

In the city of Durban, there was a major arterial road named 'Edwin Swales VC Drive', after a RAF bomber commander who died in 1945. Following proposals made by the eThekwini Municipality, the road was changed to honour Mahlangu.

A main arterial road that runs from AFB Waterkloof in Pretoria up to Solomon Mahlangu's hometown of Mamelodi (the M10 road) was renamed from Hans Strijdom Drive to Solomon Mahlangu Drive in 2012.

In 2016, the main administrative building at the University of the Witwatersrand, formerly known as Senate House, was renamed Solomon Mahlangu House.

The 2016 film Kalushi chronicles his life and times, where Thabo Rametsi played the role of Solomon.

In Tanzania, one of the top universities, Sokoine University of Agriculture, in the east region of Morogoro is known as Solomon Mahlangu Campus.

During the #FeesMustFall protests, "Solomon" was a key song recited by student activists on campuses across the country. This is a reference to Mahlangu's involvement in the anti-Apartheid struggle as a young person, his legacy and what he means to the youth of today.

In 2019, Nelson Mandela University in Port Elizabeth renamed one of their residences after him.

In 2022, Rhodes University in Makhanda renamed "Jan Smuts Hall", the largest residence on campus, to Solomon Kalushi Mahlangu Hall. During the same occasion they also renamed a second residence, Hilltop Hall, Hugh Masekela Hall to honour the South African musician.

The Transvaal Scottish Regiment was renamed the Solomon Mahlangu Regiment.

== See also ==
- Andrew Zondo
- James Mange
- Siphiwe Mvuyane
