= Priscilla Jana =

South African human rights lawyer (1943–2020)

Member of the National Assembly of South Africa
- In office 9 May 1994 – June 1999

Personal details
- Born: Devikarani Priscilla Sewpal; 5 December 1943 Westville, Natal, Union of South Africa
- Died: 10 October 2020 (aged 76) Pretoria, South Africa
- Party: African National Congress
- Spouses: Reg Jana (m. 1964; div. 1989); Reagan Jacobus (divorced)
- Education: Sophia College for Women; University of South Africa
- Occupation: Human rights lawyer
- Known for: Anti-apartheid activism; Lawyer for leading anti-apartheid leaders including Nelson Mandela, Winnie Madikizela-Mandela, Desmond Tutu, and Steve Biko

Devikarani Priscilla Sewpal Jana (5 December 1943 – 10 October 2020) was a South African human rights lawyer, politician and diplomat. As a member of the African National Congress (ANC) during the anti-apartheid movement, she participated in both legal activism as well as in the underground movement to end apartheid. She represented many significant figures in the movement, including South African president Nelson Mandela, Winnie Madikizela-Mandela, Steve Biko, Govan Mbeki, Walter Sisulu, and Archbishop Desmond Tutu. Jana was one of the very few South Africans who had access to political prisoners, including Mandela, in the maximum security Robben Island prison, and served as an emissary for coded messages between the political prisoners and the ANC leadership.

Jana's activism made her subject to violent harassment and an eventual banning order. Following the advent of full democracy in South Africa, she became a lawmaker and served as a Member of Parliament with the ANC between 1994 and 1999. She was also an ambassador of the South African government to the Netherlands and Ireland, and a commissioner with the South African Human Rights Commission. She was a member of the justice committee that was responsible for the roll-out of the South African Truth and Reconciliation Commission.

== Early life ==
Devikarani Priscilla Sewpal was born 5 December 1943, in Westville, Natal (now called KwaZulu-Natal) near the port city of Durban. She was the second child amongst three children to Hansrani Sewpal and Hansraj Sewpal. Jana's parents were middle-class Indian immigrants with her father being a high school teacher. Her father's challenging of social injustices ranging from apartheid to the Indian caste system based discrimination, was an early influence on her.

She first joined the Pietermaritzburg Girls' High School, where she organized a walkout as a part of a national potato boycott in 1958 protesting the treatment of Black farmers. She began her high school in Durban in 1960 and went to India on a Government of India scholarship to study medicine at the Sophia College for Women in Bombay (now Mumbai). Upon returning to South Africa, she started her Bachelor of Laws Degree at the University of South Africa (UNISA) in 1974, but transferred over to the University College for Indians on Salisbury Island, Durban, where she was the only woman student in the class. Her pursuit of a law degree was against the initial wishes of her parents who had wanted her to become a physician instead.

She grew up at a time when neighborhoods, schools, and all public facilities, were segregated by racial profile. Writing in her memoir, Fighting for Mandela, she recollects a meeting with anti-apartheid activist Steve Biko when she was 26 that helped solidify the notion of identity in her mind. The meeting, she says, helped make clear in her mind that one "didn't have to be African to call yourself a Black." That notion helped her find solidarity in a group. She writes, "I had found solidarity. At last, I knew where I belonged."

== Career ==
=== Early years ===
After her graduation in 1974, she joined the law firm of Ismail Ayob, a lawyer of Indian origin. The firm's clients included many in the anti-apartheid movement, including Nelson Mandela. In 1977, she went on her first of what would be many trips to Robben Island to meet Mandela. She would later write, "At one time I represented every political prisoner on Robben Island."

Visiting Mandela at Robben Island in 1977 as a solicitor needing his signatures, Jana became the first woman to hug Mandela in 13 years of imprisonment. At the time, even Mandela's wife Winnie Madikizela-Mandela could only see him through a glass panel. Jana became Mandela's personal attorney and her access allowed her to pass coded messages from the ANC organization to Mandela, while joking and teasing. As one of the very few South Africans who had access to Mandela during his imprisonment in the island, she also carried back coded messages from Mandela and the other political prisoners to the ANC leadership, including President Oliver Tambo.

As an articled clerk, she represented the members of Soweto Students' representative council, against state brutality, following the 1976 Soweto Uprising.

In one of her high-profile cases from this time she defended a 22-year-old activist and UMkhonto we Sizwe (MK) member, Solomon Mahlangu, who was eventually convicted under the Terrorism Act, 1967 for the murder of two white people. Mahlangu was sentenced to death and subsequently hanged, due to prevailing common purpose laws that judged perceived complicity as harshly as the crime itself. The case generated global outrage. Jana was one of the last of Mahlangu's supporters to see him on the night prior to his execution, and came back carrying a message to carry on with the fight for freedom. His last message conveyed through her went on to be a rallying cry for his supporters, "Tell my people that I love them. They must continue the fight. My blood will nourish the tree that bears the fruits of freedom."

In 1979, Jana opened her own law practice, focusing on civil liberties and human rights cases. However, very soon in 1980, she was handed a banning order under the Suppression of Communism Act, 1950 for five years, imposing an overnight curfew on her and limiting her to meeting with only one person, as well as limiting her public speeches.

During this time Jana also joined the underground cell of the African National Congress, UMkhonto we Sizwe, which was led by future South African President, Thabo Mbeki, from London, to whom Jana used to report. The cell had as its members Jackie Selebi, Beyers Naudé, and Cedric Mayson.

=== Opposing apartheid ===
Through her career, Jana represented many leaders of the anti-apartheid movement, including South African president Nelson Mandela, Winnie Madikizela-Mandela, Steve Biko, Ebrahim Ebrahim, Ahmed Kathrada, Solomon Mahlangu, Govan Mbeki, Walter Sisulu, and Archbishop Desmond Tutu.

She started off by representing Nelson Mandela and Winnie Madikizela-Mandela as their lawyer in the mid-1970s. She had gotten to know the couple when Mandela was serving imprisoned at the Robben Island prison. This was around the same time that Madikizela-Mandela had been arrested and detained in solitary confinement before being relegated to a segregated Black township in the Orange Free State. Racially motivated laws of the time meant that as a person of Indian origin, Jana was not allowed to stay overnight while visiting her client. She continued to remain connected with Madikizela-Mandela as she was released from Brandfort and began to appeal to more radical and younger protesters who took to more radical forms of protest in taking on authorities.

At the same time, Jana took exception when Madikizela-Mandela was sentenced to prison for kidnapping of a young boy, Stompie Moeketsi, noting that this action had resulted in the anti-apartheid movement being drawn into this matter and being tarnished in the process. She went on to raise this objection with Mandela when he was released from prison. She also expressed her own radical side when she faulted Mandela for forgiving his former opponents upon being released from prison.

Jana was targeted by state agents in the mid-1980s, with her home bombed with Molotov cocktail attacks. Her offices were periodically raided, with files and documents often rummaged through in an effort to intimidate her. But, these actions did not deter her. She took on activist client Popo Molefe and his wife Phinda Molefe's baby girl, Albertina, when the mother left her behind in Jana's office in despair. Many years later, in 2001, Jana officially adopted Albertina.

Jana also represented the poet Benjamin Moloise, who was condemned to death by hanging for the killing of a policeman in 1982. Her efforts had helped mobilize global attention and subsequent calls from global organizations and governments asking the then-South African government to grant clemency. Jana was with Moloise's elderly mother on a vigil in 1985 when the elder Moloise's house was surrounded by soldiers and tear-gassed. An earlier request by her for a retrial had been turned down by the South African government. Moloise was executed in October 1985, at the age of 30.

Representing Govan Mbeki, former national chairman of the African National Congress, Jana helped secure his release from the Robben Island prison in 1987, after serving 23 years of a life sentence. The release of the 77-year-old came with severe restrictions including geographical limits for him to remain within the Port Elizabeth region. This release was regarded as a "trial run" for the eventual release of Nelson Mandela from the same prison.

Jana was also a part of the Black Consciousness Movement that opposed movements to ensure multiracialism in the African National Congress. In a high-profile case, she took on the South African Medical and Dental Council in 1984 to prove that two doctors who were providing care to anti-apartheid activist and Black Consciousness Movement leader Steve Biko, had acted improperly when Biko died in custody in 1977. The case ended up finding the two white doctors guilty in 1985. She was also an activist member of the Democratic Women's Movement, and issued calls for boycott of the apartheid elections and the creation of a new apartheid constitution, in August 1985. Participating in the campaign to boycott the elections, she had said, "Anybody, Colored or Indian, who participates in the new constitution will be as guilty as the perpetrators of this crime against the people. He who participates is a traitor."

In this period, Jana was a part of a collective of legal challengers who battled civil and human rights cases across the country to end apartheid and usher democracy into the country. At a time when most legal activists saw their role within the bounds of the legal system, Jana often crossed over into being a radical activist. While she worked as lawyer on human rights cases, she would be seen working at nights with underground activists on more violent means to combat apartheid, including having carried AK-47s in the boot of her car from Soweto on behalf of an underground client, to prevent their confiscation. Through this period, she was also a member of Black People's Convention and the Anti-Constitutional Committee and Federation of Transvaal Women.

=== Later years ===
With the advent of democracy and the African National Congress (ANC) in power in 1994, Jana joined as an ANC lawmaker, and served as a Member of Parliament between 1994 and 1999. She represented Krugersdorp. She had also been a member of the South African Law Commission, and a member of the Presidential Advisory Committee. She was a member of the justice committee that was responsible for the roll-out of the Truth and Reconciliation Commission. Jana was also a contributor to President Thabo Mbeki's Millennium Africa Recovery Programme (MAP), which represented a pan-African initiative to set Africa on a path to sustainable development and growth, and actions to eradicate poverty. Writing in a paper titled African Renaissance and the Millennium Action Plan, Jana described the framework as bringing together Africa's resources, across a combination of mineral and material, bio-diversity, cultural, and human resources, to deliver on continent-wide development goals.

She also went on to serve as South Africa's ambassador to the Netherlands from 2001 to 2005 and as the ambassador to Ireland from 2006 to 2011, serving as a diplomat for a total of nine years. She took charge as the commissioner and deputy chair person of the South African Human Rights Commission (SAHRC) in 2017.

She was the recipient of a lifetime achievement award at the Woza Awards in 2017, an award established to identify and recognize women in the legal fraternity.

== Personal life ==
Jana (then Sewpal) met her husband Reg Jana, who was a South African student studying in India, when she was studying medicine at the Sophia College for Women in Bombay. Writing in her memoir about life after her wedding, she speaks about her husband's large family and traditional expectations from the daughter-in-law of the family as a cause for differences between them. While Reg would continue to be with her during her struggles, his multiple affairs during this period led Jana to seek a divorce. She writes of the banning order being a cause for great stress and ruining her life and marriage. Their marriage ended in a divorce in 1989. However, she kept the last name. She then married Reagan Jacobus, a self-made lawyer, with that marriage leading to a divorce in the mid-1990s. In 2001, she adopted her foster-daughter Albertina Jana Molefe, who was the daughter of an activist client, Popo Molefe. At the same time she also adopted her brother's son, Shivesh Sewpal.

Jana died on 10 October 2020 in a care home in Pretoria at the age of 76. The cause for her death was not specified. She is survived by a daughter, Alberta Jana Molefe, and a son, Shivesh Sewpal. In a statement, the African National Congress, calling attention to her sacrifices for the anti-apartheid liberation movement, stated, "at a time when she could have chosen to selfishly pursue personal wealth and material advancement. Instead, she understood her career as a calling, to serve the people of South Africa, especially the poor and powerless."

== Book ==
- Jones, Barbara; Jana, Priscilla (2016). Fighting For Mandela - The Explosive Autobiography of The Woman Who Helped to Destroy Apartheid. Metro Publishing. ISBN 978-1-78606-064-8.
