= James Mange =

South African activist and musician

James Mange, 2026

Mncedisi James Daniel Doyen Mange is a South African former anti-apartheid activist, political prisoner and reggae musician.

In 1979, as a member of uMkhonto weSizwe, Mange was sentenced to death on charges of high treason. Following international outcry, his sentence was commuted to 20 years' imprisonment the following year. While incarcerated on Robben Island, he converted to Rastafari and formed the reggae band James Mange and the Whiplashes. He was released from prison in 1991 during the end of apartheid. With his new neighbour, he founded the Soccer Party, which participated in the 1994 general election.

== Biography ==
James Mange grew up in the township of Soweto, where his family were forced to regularly relocate under the provisions of the Group Areas Act. Following the Soweto uprising in 1976, Mange, like many young South Africans, joined uMkhonto weSizwe, the armed wing of the African National Congress, and left the country for guerilla training in Angola. After re-entering the country, Mange was arrested in the town of Warmbaths in 1978 over an alleged plot to attack a police station. In September 1979, he was placed on trial with 11 other guerillas in Pietermaritzburg, who were collectively dubbed the "Maritzburg 12". Mange, then aged 24, was sentenced to death on 15 November, while the other defendants received sentences that reached a combined total of 184 years. Mange's sentencing was legally unprecedented as he was the first ever person to be sentenced to death in South Africa over a case that involved no loss of life, and only the second person to be convicted of treason—defendants in the 1956 Treason Trial had been cleared. The verdict, which came months after the execution of Solomon Mahlangu, provoked an international backlash which included a campaign for clemency from the global anti-apartheid movement. The case was seen as potentially hazardous for the reform agenda of Prime Minister P. W. Botha. On 11 September 1980, his sentence was commuted to 20 years' imprisonment, and he was transferred from Pretoria Central Prison to Robben Island.

During the same year, Mange formed a reggae group, the Whiplashes, with fellow prisoners. He taught music to other inmates, performed and was nicknamed the "Bob Marley of Robben Island". After converting to Rastafarianism, Mange developed a fraught relationship with the ANC, which viewed the religion as counter-revolutionary. However, he did not affiliate himself with rival anti-regime factions such as the Pan Africanist Congress or Black Consciousness Movement. Mange was released from prison on 27 April 1991, and released his debut album with the Whiplashes, Read My Story, on Africa Records the same year. In 1992, he appeared in the documentary film The Long Journey of Clement Zulu, which follows him, Clement Zulu and Ebrahim Ismail Ebrahim as they are released from Robben Island and reintegrated into society. The documentary was banned following its initial release for political reasons.

After his release from prison, Mange moved into a mainly white area of Johannesburg where he formed a new political party, the Soccer Party (a backronym for "Sports Organisation for Collective Contribution and Equal Rights") with his white neighbour, Neil Hellmann, to participate in South Africa's first non-racial election in 1994. The party used the soccer ball – which contains black and white hexagons – as a metaphor for multiracial co-operation, and aimed to emphasise aspects of society, such as sport, music and the arts, that could transcend cultural divides. The party also supported the decriminalisation of cannabis and prostitution. The party was registered with authorities on the final day in which parties could sign up for the election, resulting in images of party leaders wearing sports gear being broadcast on television, in which they proclaimed themselves "the only guys fit to govern". The party's national electoral list featured Daryll Cullinan, then a member of the South Africa national cricket team. The party won a total of 10,575 votes nationwide, failing to gain representation in the National Assembly. In 2006, his story was the subject of an SABC documentary entitled James Mange: The Man Who Shook Pretoria.
