= Jerry Masisi =

South African General

SA Adjutant Defence Attaché to France
- In office 2005–2008
- Appointed by: Thabo Mbeki; Siphiwe Nyanda

ANC Regional Political Committee Chairman in Angola
- In office 1988–1991
- Preceded by: January Masilela (as Politico-Military Council Chairman)
- Succeeded by: Godfrey Ngwenya (as Ambassador to Angola in 2011)

Personal details
- Born: 26 December 1958 (age 67) Soweto, South Africa
- Spouse: Brigadier General Patience Masisi
- Children: 3
- Occupation: Guerilla fighter, military diplomat, politician

Military service
- Allegiance: ANC

Philemon Jerry Masisi, (born 26 December 1958) is a retired South African General, military commander and an MK guerilla. He joined Umkhonto we Sizwe (MK), the military wing of the African National Congress, and served in multiple roles while fighting against the South African government from the 1970s. He transferred to the South African National Defence Force after MK was incorporated into it in 1998, and has served as a Defence Attaché in Paris, France from 2005 to 2008 before being the commanding officer of the 8 Medical Battalion Group, from 2008 to 2011. He was responsible for the operation that assisted hospitals with medical assistance during the 2010 health sector strike. He was subsequently promoted to Brigadier General, assuming the position of Director Military Health Human Resources.

== Early life and education ==
General Masisi attended primary school in Soweto and relocated to Rustenburg in 1974, to attend high school. He eventually completed his high school in Solomon Mahlangu Freedom College. Other academic qualifications include an Honours Degree in Sociology and Anthropology from the University of Maiduguri, a Master's degree in Conflict, Peace and Security from the Kofi Annan International Peacekeeping Training Centre and a PhD Session Certificate in Diplomacy from Centre d'Etudes Diplomatiques et Stratégiques (CEDS).

== Military career ==
Brigadier General Jerry Masisi (Ret)
- Born: 26 December 1958 (age 67)
- Military career
- Allegiance: South Africa
- Branch: SAMHS; Umkhonto we Sizwe Special Operations
- Service years: 1970s–1998 (MK); 1998–2016 (SANDF)
- Rank: Brigadier General
- Nickname: Jerry
- Commands: uMkhonto we Sizwe (Political Commissar in Angola); Defence Attache to France (2005–2008); 8 Medical Battalion Group (2008–2011)
- Conflicts: Internal resistance to apartheid; Battle of Cuito Cuanavale
- Awards: Operational Medal for Southern Africa South Africa Service Medal Unitas (Unity) Medal Service Medal

Masisi joined the African National Congress (ANC) in the 1970s and was involved in its underground activities. In the 1980s, he served as an MK political commissar during the liberation struggle against the South African government. He obtained his military training in Ethiopia and received an advanced ranger commando training, alongside a detachment of SWAPO guerillas. During this time, he commanded Operation LOCUST APRIL 14, which was a conclusive operation for the training which he received. According to the ANC, this detachment of guerillas was supposed to infiltrate South Africa and be the first combat operatives to initiate Operation Vula. He served as a political instructor, specialising in politics and the Marxism-Leninism philosophy and was elected as the Chairperson of the Regional Political Committee (RPC) of the ANC in Angola in the mid-1980s and attended the ANC Military Seminar, which laid the foundations for Operation Vula. In 1991, he left Angola to study in Nigeria

In 1997, Masisi returned to South Africa and joined the South African National Defence Force in 1998. Although his proposed rank of integration was Brigadier General, as he had fulfilled all criteria to integrate with the rank, he integrated with the rank of Colonel. From 1999 to 2004, he served in multiple senior positions in the South African Military Health Service (SAMHS), serving as Senior Staff Officer Strategy from 1999 to 2000, Senior Staff Officer Career Management from 2001 to 2004 and briefly served as Director Military Health Human Resources in an acting capacity. In 2003, he completed the Executive National Security Programme (ENSP), whilst preparing for external deployment. In 2005, he was appointed as the Adjutant Defence Attaché to the South African Embassy in Paris, with shuttle accreditation to Belgium and the Netherlands. During his tenure, he attended many AFRICOM conferences and greatly improved military relations, with regard to military and military health services between France and South Africa.

When his tour of duty ended in 2008, he was appointed as the Commander of the 8 Medical Battalion Group, a unit that specialises in military health field operations, and is closely linked with the 7 Medical Battalion Group. In 2010, Masisi was promoted to the substantive rank of Brigadier General, in the post of Director Military Health Human Resources, a post that oversees the career management of the entire strength of the SAMHS, whilst under the command of Vejaynand Ramlakan, who was a close friend and colleague. In 2014, he was transferred to the Inspectorate Division of the Department of Defence (DOD) and served as the leader of Project Mounting, which probes into the auditing of management structures within the DOD. He quietly retired in 2016.

== Honours and awards ==
=== Military ranks ===
During his military career, Masisi attained the following ranks:

Year	Military rank
1998	Proposed Rank: Brigadier (after careful consideration, he was appointed as a colonel)
2011	Brigadier General

=== Medals ===
During his military career, General Masisi was awarded the following medals:

- SADC Peace Support Operations Medal, 2009
- Operational Medal for Southern Africa
- South Africa Service Medal
- Unitas (Unity) Medal
- Service Medal (Gold) (Note: represented by Medalje vir Troue Diens (Medal for Loyal Service) (30 Year Clasp))
- Service Medal (Silver) (Note: represented by Good Service Medal (Silver (20 Years)))
- Service Medal (Bronze)

He has not yet been awarded the following

- Medalje vir Troue Diens (Medal for Loyal Service) (40 Year Clasp) (pending)
