= ANC Today =

Web-based newsletter published by the African National Congress

- Type: Weekly political party news
- Format: Online newspaper, Print
- Owner: African National Congress (ANC)
- Publisher: ANC
- Political alignment: ANC
- Language: English
- Headquarters: Marshalltown, 2107, Johannesburg
- Country: South Africa
- Website: www.anc1912.org.za/anc-today-2025/

ANC Today is a weekly web-based newsletter published by the African National Congress (ANC). It consists mainly of updates on current programmes and initiatives of the ANC.

In 2001, the ANC launched an online party newspaper ANC Today – Online Voice of the African National Congress to offset the alleged bias of the white-controlled press.

== Notes and references ==
- Fourie, P.J. (July 2002). "Rethinking the role of the media in South Africa : research article". Communicare: Journal for Communication Sciences in Southern Africa. 21 (1): 17–40. doi:10.36615/jcsa.v21i1.1826. hdl:10520/EJC27600. ISSN 0259-0069. S2CID 142827453.
- Fourie, Pieter J. (2008). Media Studies Volume 2: Policy, management and media representation (second ed.). Cape Town: Juta and Company. ISBN 978-0-7021-7675-3.
- Glenn, Ian; Mattes, Robert (2012). "Political Communication in Post-Apartheid South Africa". In Semetko, Holli A.; Scammell, Margaret (eds.). The SAGE Handbook of Political Communication. SAGE Publications. pp. 494–508. ISBN 978-1-4462-6598-7.
- Wasserman, Herman; de Beer, Arnold S. (2005). "A Fragile Affair: The Relationship Between the Mainstream Media and Government in Post-Apartheid South Africa". Journal of Mass Media Ethics. 20 (2–3): 192–208. doi:10.1080/08900523.2005.9679708. ISSN 0890-0523. S2CID 145533804.
- Wasserman, Herman (2005). "Debating the media, shaping identity: Postcolonial discourse and public criticism". Communicatio. 31 (1): 49–60. doi:10.1080/02500160508538011. ISSN 0250-0167. S2CID 145651011.
- Duncan, Jane (2009). "The uses and abuses of political economy: The ANC's media policy". Transformation: Critical Perspectives on Southern Africa. 70 (1): 1–30. doi:10.1353/trn.0.0039. ISSN 1726-1368. S2CID 154621159.
- Chuma, Wallace (2006). "The Limits and Possibilities of Virtual Political Communication in Transforming South Africa: A Case Study of ANC Today and SA Today" (PDF). Intercultural Communication Studies. 15 (2). Archived from the original (PDF) on 15 September 2012.
