= Dikgope Madi =

Dikgope Andrew "Magic Bones" Madi was an Umkhonto we Sizwe, or MK, combatant involved in the liberation struggle under apartheid.

He is believed to have been involved in military operations and extortions, including the 1981 bombing of the Sibasa police station which killed two police officers and crippled a third one. Madi was later kidnapped and tortured by the South African Security Police and secretly buried at Thohoyandou. Following the exhumation of his body in December 1997, along with 11 other combatants and under the direction of the then Premier Ngoako Ramatlhodi, he was reburied military-style at Marapyane in Mpumalanga on 11 January 1998.

The investigation undertaken around his death and exhumation illustrates the challenges faced by the exhumation process of the Truth and Reconciliation Commission.

== The TRC investigation ==
The investigation revealed that Mr Madi was suspected to have died in August 1983 at Tshipise, Venda, in an incident that cost the life of two other combatants, Patrick Motswaletswale and Humbulani Mulaudzi.

The family of Motswaletswale was the first to contact the Ministry of Safety and Security in order for this incident to be investigated. The case was later transferred to the Johannesburg office of theTruth and Reconciliation Commission (TRC), which established the identity of the combatants, Motswaletswale and Mulaudzi, but the third combatants was referred to as Mandi. The only information about the latter was that he was originally from Alexandra.

Once the burial site located in Mbaleni in Sibasa, the Commission undertook to establish the connection between Madi and Mandi and therefore to carry out an exhumation. This process led to an MK officer based in Zimbabwe of the time of the death of the combatants identifying Mandi as being Madi. However, the necessary information confirming the identity of the deceased was scarce. Andrew Mandi was not listed as an ANC operative dead in exile but Andrew Madi was one of them, registered as killed in Rhodesia in 1979. Complicating the matter, the two other combatants were listed as having been killed in August 1983 in Venda.

Related to the case was a Human Rights Violation Testimony submitted by Matsutse Elias Madi living in Alexandra, Johannesburg. This testimony revealed that Matsutse Elias Madi's son, Dikgope Molefe ‘Magic Bones’ Madi, disappeared on 28 August 1978 after mentioning a possible project of exile. No investigation was opened by the police. Three or four years later, Madi received an anonymous letter saying that his son was in Tanzania. After the unbanning of the ANC in 1990, Madi was informed of the existence Lovinest Nyerende from Malawi, supposedly Dikgope's girlfriend. She revealed that she had last seen her boyfriend in Tanzania in 1978 and that he had gone to Zimbabwe in order to fetch other exiles and never returned. In July 1992, Madi was informed by ANC officials that Dikgope died in Zimbabwe during the war. This version suggests that Andrew Madi and Andrew Mandi were two different people. Nevertheless, they shared almost identical names and both came from Alexandra.

Two other Human Rights Violation testimonies and additional information in other records later confirmed that three people were killed in Venda in 1983. But no source could cast light on the identity of the third victim, the two other being Patrick Motswaletswale and Humbulani Mulaudzi. It was finally an MK operative based in Zimbabwe during the Venda incident who was able to identify Dikgope Andrew ‘Magic Bones’ Madi as the third victim since while detained he had already been taken to identify the bodies in Venda and knew 'Magic Bones' personally.

== Contributions ==
The process of exhumation was a challenging part of the Truth and Reconciliation Commission mandate, but it allowed families to get closer to the truth of what happened to their loved ones and get some closure. The collaboration of the different branches of the TRC allowed for the family of Dikgope Andrew 'Magic Bones' Madi to get some closure with his exhumation and reburial. However, no one claimed responsibility for his murder.
