= Tom Sebina =

South African political spokesman

Thomas Letlalo

ANC Head of Department of Information and Publicity
- In office May 1983 – 1990; *He co-headed this department with Pallo Jordan and Thabo Mbeki

MK Chief of Communications
- In office 1965–1970
- Preceded by: office established
- Succeeded by: Mavuso Msimang

ANC Chief Representative for Senegal
- In office 1971–1978

Personal details
- Born: 17 November 1937 Johannesburg, South Africa
- Died: August 11, 1997 (aged 59)
- Relations: William Letlalo (father); Rachel Letlalo (mother); Roy Letlalo (brother); Patrick Letlalo (brother); Brigadier General Patience Masisi (niece)
- Nickname(s): Tom, Thoboko Sebina, "Boots" (alias)

Military service
- Allegiance: South Africa
- Branch/service: Umkhonto we Sizwe
- Years of service: 1963–1994
- Rank: Political Commissar
- Commands: Umkhonto we Sizwe
- Battles/wars: Wankie-Sipolilo Campaign

Tom Sebina (born Thomas Letlalo c. 1937; died August 11, 1997) was a South African political spokesman. He was a senior member of the African National Congress (ANC) and its spokesperson in exile. Letlalo joined uMkhonto we Sizwe (the armed wing of the ANC; abbreviated MK) on its inception in 1961 and received military training in the Soviet Union and in Ethiopia in 1963. He was briefly responsible for MK communications upon founding its journal, Dawn, in 1966. From Dawn he was moved to work in Mayibuye. According to Pallo Jordan, "It was during those years that his talent as a writer and publicist came into its own. After a long tenure in Mayibuye, he was appointed from the ANC's International Department as the Chief Representative of the ANC in Senegal from 1971 to 1978. In Senegal, he got the opportunity to fluently learn French, adding to an impressive repertoire of language skills which included his native Sepedi, as well as English, Afrikaans, Zulu and Swahili. He was reassigned to Zambia in 1982, before being appointed as the chief spokesperson of the ANC.

== Political career ==
In 1982, a couple of years after he was the ANC's Chief Representative in Dakar, he was reassigned to Zambia, shortly after Thabo Mbeki assumed the reigns as Secretary of Information and was instrumental in organising the first national conference of the Department of Information and Publicity in May 1983. That conference was an important turning point for the ANC communications strategy and Sebina's personal profile. The conference took a number of decisions, the most significant of which was to actively relate to the SA Media. As an experienced journalist with contacts among the new generation of black editors, Sebina was seen as the best suited person to play such a role. Sebina was also responsible for setting the tone for future negotiations with the South African Government, after the ANC's Kabwe Conference, where he attracted, and directly interacted with South African business organizations, and senior businessmen, such as Gavin Reilly, Anglo American chairman, on behalf of the ANC. Unbanning the ANC, a delicate process, which relied heavily on endorsement from the white economy leaders, Sebina managed to win their support, without compromising any of his political views, nor his party's views. The negotiations process, which started officially in 1991, was catalysed by Sebina and Thabo Mbeki. After 1990, Sebina remained in Lusaka, as the ANC's headquarters shifted from Lusaka, to Shell House, and was forgotten by the ANC leadership until an SABC journalist captured his story, and assisted to bring him back to South Africa and reunite him with his family. Upon his arrival, he had a feud with Alfred Nzo, for 'taking' his position as Minister of Foreign Affairs, because Sebina was more relevant heading that portfolio, given his role in the liberation struggle against Apartheid, rather than the communications portfolio.
