= Operation Skerwe =

1983 Aerial Operations in Mozambique

- Location: Mozambique Operation Skerwe (Mozambique)
- Objective: Destruction of ANC planning, training and bomb making facilities
- Date: 23 May 1983
- Outcome: South African victory; successful air raid
- Casualties: 64 People Killed; 17 Mozambican Soldier killed; 8 Civilians killed

Operation Skerwe (English: Operation Shards) was a military operation conducted by the South African Air Force (SAAF) against African National Congress (ANC) facilities based in the Matola suburb of Maputo city.

== Background ==
On 20 May 1983, a car bomb exploded in the late afternoon in Church Street, Pretoria. The target was the South African Air Force Headquarters timed to catch the staff leaving the building for home. The bomb had been set by the ANC based in Mozambique. The car bomb killed 19 and wounded between 188 and more than 200 people.

== Operation ==
Planning for the operation begun on 21 May, a day after the bombing when Commandant Steyn Venter was directed to take four Impala strike aircraft with rocket pods to the airbase at Hoedspruit. There he was joined by eight other Impala's from 4 Squadron and 8 Squadron. One Canberra bomber, from the Waterkloof airbase flown by Major Des Barker, would also take part in the operation. As the aircrew planned their mission based on reconnaissance photographs, video and models of the targets, ground crews readied the aircraft for the mission the following day. The plan called for a low level approach down the river into Maputo then climbing for the attack on the street in Matola in pairs, in line astern positions, attack only if the targets were visible, before climbing left and the returning to a low level formation back to South Africa. The mission for Sunday 22 May, after initial issues with the aircraft and low cloud, was called off after taxiing to the runway. On Monday 23 May, the aircraft took off at 06h40 for Maputo. The Canberra bomber contacted the Maputo control tower informing them of the raid and not to interfere. The Impala strike aircraft then lined up for the attack with most firing their rockets at the target houses in the street. The South African Impala aircraft arrived back safely at the airbase at Hoedspruit with little fuel to spare while the Canberra bomber returned to Waterkloof outside Pretoria.

== Aftermath ==
The casualty figures are conflicting with the Mozambique government claiming that 6 people died including 2 children and 26 people wounded. The South African military claiming 64 people killed, 41 being ANC operatives, 17 Mozambican soldiers and 6 civilians while other sources claimed 8 civilians died.

Western diplomats and journalists were given a three-hour guided tour of Matola by the Mozambican Information Ministry officials. They were shown minimal rocket damage to building's and a juice and jam factory with little to show that the ANC lived in the street with residents claiming the ANC residents had moved out three months earlier. The South African military claimed that the site had been sanitized before the visit and that they had attacked the planning offices of the ANC unit responsible for the Pretoria bombings. The South Africans also claimed they had neutralized an antiaircraft missile site.
