= Ike Maphotho =

South African anti-apartheid activist (1931–2019)

Member of the Limpopo Provincial Legislature
- In office 27 April 1994 – 6 May 2014

Personal details
- Born: 26 February 1931 Ga-Makgato, South Africa
- Died: 13 July 2019 (aged 88) Polokwane, South Africa
- Resting place: Heroes Acre; Silicon Cemetery, Polokwane
- Party: African National Congress
- Education: Uitkyk Secondary School
- Awards: The Order of Luthuli in Silver (2006)

Isaac Lesiba Maphotho (26 February 1931 – 13 July 2019) was a South African anti-apartheid activist, revolutionary leader, African National Congress (ANC) stalwart and Umkhonto we Sizwe (MK) veteran. Maphotho had previously served as a Member of the Limpopo Provincial Legislature.

== Early life ==
Isaac Lesiba Maphotho was born in Ga-Makgato in the then Transvaal province on 26 February 1931. He fulfilled his Standard 6 (Grade 8) education at the Uitkyk Secondary School in 1952. Maphotho soon relocated to Pretoria later in the same year in order to seek employment. He was employed by the Pretoria City Council, working in the now-defunct Department of Native Affairs.

== Career ==
He later became a member of the ANC and consequent party organiser in the areas of Benoni and Atteridgeville. He was one of the initial recruits of the Umkhonto we Sizwe (MK) organisation, which was founded in December 1961. Maphotho became involved in underground activities of the ANC prior to him leaving the country to go to Dar es Salaam, Tanzania on 28 February 1961. The ANC deployed him to the Beirut International School in 1962. He returned to Dar es Salaam in 1963 and was soon sent for military training in the now-dissolved Soviet Union.

Maphotho served as the commander of the Luthuli Detachment. After fulfilling his training in 1965, he was deployed to the Kongwa Camp in Tanzania, from which he was a commander until 1967, and was promoted to the post of Chief Logistics Officer of the Detachment. The Rhodesian security personnel arrested him on 6 April 1968. He was sentenced to death on 9 August 1968 and imprisoned at the Khami Maximum Prison. He was released by the Zimbabwe Government of Prime Minister Robert Mugabe on 14 May 1980.

During the 1980s, he travelled to various countries during his tenure as a leader of the ANC to muster international support for the ANC against the apartheid government. Maphotho returned to South Africa in 1992. He served in the Limpopo Provincial Government and as a Member of the Limpopo Provincial Legislature. He helped initiate the Limpopo Premier's Bursary Fund. President Thabo Mbeki awarded him the Order of Luthuli in Silver in 2006.

== Death and legacy ==
Maphotho died of natural causes during the early hours of 13 July 2019 at his home in Bendor, Polokwane. National Spokesperson of the ANC, Pule Mabe, confirmed his death. He was 88 years old at the time of his death. President Cyril Ramaphosa declared on 17 July 2019 that a state funeral would be held for Maphotho. His funeral was held on 21 July 2019. President Ramaphosa delivered the eulogy. He is the first person to be buried at the newly-established Heroes Acre section of the Silicon Cemetery in Polokwane.

The ANC Polokwane branch is named after Maphotho.
