= Amanzimtoti bombing =

1985 terrorist attack in South Africa

- Part of Part of the Apartheid and Internal resistance to apartheid
- Amanzimtoti (South Africa)
- Location: Amanzimtoti, Natal Province
- Date: 23 December 1985
- Deaths: 6
- Injuries: +60
- Victims: Three Afrikaner minors, Willem Arie van Wyk, 2, Isabella Margretha van Wyk, 5, Johan Smit, 8, Irma Bencini, 48 and Anna Shearer, 43.
- Perpetrators: Andrew Sibusiso Zondo, member of the ANC's Umkhonto we Sizwe

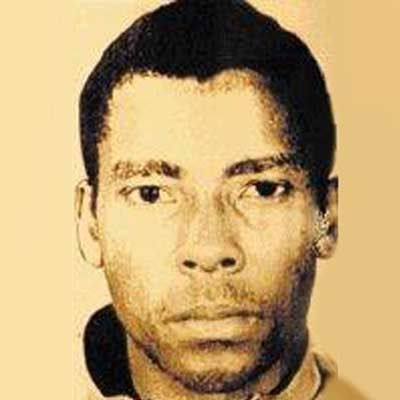
Mugshot of Andrew Zondo

The Amanzimtoti bombing took place on 23 December 1985 when five white South African civilians were killed and more than 60 were wounded when Andrew Sibusiso Zondo, a member of uMkhonto we Sizwe (MK), detonated a limpet mine inside a rubbish bin at a shopping centre.

== Background ==
The bombing was carried out during a period of heightened tension in South Africa, as the country was in the midst of political unrest as a result of the anti-apartheid struggle and the government's declaration of a state of emergency earlier that year. In the days leading up to the bombing, members of the South African Defence Force (SADF) entered Maseru, the capital of Lesotho, and assassinated six suspected ANC operatives and three Basotho civilians. An accomplice of Zondo later testified that the shopping mall attack was in retaliation for the SADF raid.

In the days of apartheid, the area around Amanzimtoti was known as a popular vacation destination for White families.

== Bombing ==
At approximately 2:30 PM, Zondo detonated a limpet mine in a rubbish bin outside the Amanzimtoti Sanlam shopping centre in southern Natal Province, killing five civilians and injuring more than 60 two days before Christmas. Many of the casualties were women and children who were shopping or passing through the area at the time of the explosion.

The bombing sent shockwaves throughout the country, as prior MK attacks had rarely targeted White civilians, leading to widespread condemnation. MK claimed it was a part of their strategy to destabilize the apartheid government. However, there was also significant debate over the ethics and impact of targeting civilians in such attacks. Many South Africans, even those opposed to apartheid, criticized the bombing for causing unnecessary harm to civilians.

The attack occurred a few months after the ANC’s policy conference in Kabwe, Zambia, wherein the organization, headed by Oliver Tambo, formally committed to major policy shifts, including opening membership to all races and escalating the armed struggle against apartheid in South Africa.

== Aftermath ==
Three Afrikaner children, Willem Arie van Wyk 2 years old, Isabella Margretha van Wyk 5 years old and eight-year-old Johan Smit were killed, in addition to two women, Irma Bencini, 48 and Anna Shearer, 43. 61 people were injured, many of them with permanent injuries and disabilities.

Zondo was captured on 29 December 1985 by the South African security forces. He was prosecuted, found guilty, and sentenced to death. He was executed in Pretoria on 9 September 1986. The judge who sentenced him to death was Judge Johan Theron, often incorrectly cited as Judge Ramon Leon (the judge that originally found him guilty of the murders – after Zondo admitted to an accomplice that he was "disappointed in the body count, wishing it to have been higher"). Two other MK operatives, Phumezo Nxiweni and Sipho Stanley Bhila, were alleged to have been involved in the bombing, but were acquitted. In separate incidents, Nxiweni and Bhila would later be abducted and killed by Security Branch operatives.

The attack was part of a shift in the tactics used by MK in the mid-to-late 1980s. Previously, attacks primarily targeted military assets and personnel, but following the Amanzimtoti bombing, attacks on White civilians would increase in frequency.

In a submission to the Truth and Reconciliation Commission (TRC), the ANC stated that Zondo's act, though "understandable" as a response to the South African Defence Force raid in Lesotho, was not in line with ANC policy.

== See also ==
- Internal resistance to apartheid
- Church Street, Pretoria bombing
- List of massacres in South Africa
- Messina landmine attack
