= Siphiwe Mvuyane =

Notorious South African police officer

Siphiwe Mvuyane was a South African police officer involved in political killings in the Bantustan of KwaZulu. He died on 9 May 1993.

== Prologue ==
During the period of "low intensity warfare" in South Africa which largely pitted the African National Congress (ANC) and Inkatha Freedom Party (IFP), Siphiwe Mvuyane was on the side of the IFP. During the period of the "low intensity warfare", the IFP was the sole ruling party of the Bantustan KwaZulu government, and worked in collaboration with the apartheid government, whereas the ANC was operating underground; as a result the IFP had an upper hand over the ANC when it came to the warfare. But post apartheid, the African National Congress (ANC) became the governing party in South Africa whereas the Inkatha Freedom Party (IFP) became one of the opposition parties in the South African parliament, as a result the ANC gained the upper hand over the IFP in the remaining years of the warfare as the ANC was in control of the state apparatus by virtue of being the governing party. The IFP leadership denied its involvement in sanctioning and orchestrating political violence in the furtherance of its political objectives during the period of the "low intensity warfare" in South Africa.

Siphiwe Mvuyane was a fearsome resident of Umlazi township at the time of his death, and he attended Menzi High School which is situated at the same township but his hometown was Pietermaritzburg. After completing high school he joined the now defunct South African Police (SAP) around 1986, after which he transferred to the now defunct KwaZulu Police (KZP) around 1987-88. He was married. He carried out most of his killings under the auspices of KZP. He was stationed at Umlazi Police Station which was popularly known as "GG Police Station", and was assigned to a Murder and Robbery Unit. He also worked temporarily in Ulundi after he was allegedly advised to flee Durban, but did not stay long in Ulundi as Ulundi was a rural area and Mvuyane was the man of city life. It was not long after he had returned to Durban that he met his death. While at Ulundi he allegedly killed a snake with a single shot and bemoaned the fact that he was killing snakes instead of people.

The ANC intelligence (now defunct) allegedly succeeded in recruiting Mvuyane's colleagues as informers at the GG Police Station who would spy on Mvuyane as it was believed that he was abusing his position as a police officer to kill ANC activists. The ANC intelligence would know beforehand the cases that would be allocated to Mvuyane. They would quickly investigate the cases allocated to him and forewarn the suspected criminals about the coming of Mvuyane. Inevitably this scheme produced unintended consequences in that pure criminals ended up being tipped-off as most of the cases Mvuyane officially investigated were not political. Mvuyane's political killings took place clandestinely after hours but he also did commit killings during the course of his official duties.

There is no official date for the commencement of the "low intensity warfare" in South Africa but it is generally accepted that the warfare commenced following the fallout between the IFP and ANC at the famous 1979 London meeting. The early 1980s saw political unrest and "black on black" violence begin in earnest in the country, and sometimes this warfare was referred to as "people's war".

The nature of this warfare took the form of carefully planned assassinations which involved an element of surprise, setting up and utilising intelligence structures. The assassination would happen at a time and place that the victim least expected it.

== Controversy ==
Siphiwe Mvuyane was primarily in combat (during a period of low intensity warfare in South Africa) with the armed military wing of the ANC, Umkhonto we Sizwe (MK). He allegedly killed many undercover operatives of MK trained from Russia and other African countries. Mvuyane was allegedly a policeman by day (investigating normal criminal cases) and a paid assassin by night (killing ANC activists). In the Truth and Reconciliation Commission (TRC) reports, one of the applicants indicated that Mvuyane was a commander of killing squads on the East Coast of South Africa, the KwaZulu-Natal Province. Mvuyane's position as a commander of killings squads was a covert underhanded position. The precision with which he carried out his assassinations (the precision that one would envisage in the engineering space) earned him promotion to the position of a commander of killing squads.

When political violence reached epic proportions in the early 1990s, international investors and negotiators such as John Aitchison of the University of Natal in Pietermaritzburg and Kim Hodgson of the Inkatha Institute in Durban became worried at the pace at which black political leaders were dying that South Africa would be 'leaderless' by the time apartheid came to an end. Mvuyane was, to a certain extent, directly involved in that conflict, and was accused of shooting people without reasonable justification. These political killings created space for uneducated people to emerge as new leaders of the masses, as knowledgeable leaders were getting decimated. The situation also made it difficult for international investors to negotiate with future leaders who would inherit the new democratic state as these leaders were getting killed on a daily basis. For example, Mr Ngwenya an ANC leader in the Pietermaritzburg area was gunned down on 8 February 1992 after leaving a Pietermaritzburg restaurant where he had dined with a delegation of 15 Americans. A day before Mr Ngwenya was killed, Mr Winnington Sabelo, an IFP leader at Umlazi Township in Durban had been assassinated. KwaZulu-Natal was the epicentre of political violence that engulfed the whole of South Africa at the time. However, Mvuyane would occasionally be spotted in other provinces.

Mvuyane could be described as a celebrity killer. He revelled in his reputation of being a dreaded killer. Mvuyane claimed in a local newspaper to have killed more than 20 but not more than 50 people. There was a belief that he was immune from prosecution as it was believed that he was carrying out instructions of those in the high echelons of government at the time. The local magistrates and prosecutors were afraid to prosecute him. He claimed that he killed suspected criminals in self-defence or for preventing them from escaping.

On 14 May 1992, he was arrested in connection with an arms cache made by a US gun manufacturer Mossberg and Sons of Connecticut, but the case remained pending up to the point of his demise. There was strong suspicion that these arms would be used in fuelling political violence in South Africa. It is believed that the ANC once threatened to withdraw from the Convention for a Democratic South Africa (CODESA) negotiations if the killers involved in political violence were not arrested. It is for this reason that during CODESA the apartheid government started arresting in droves all those who were involved in political violence. Mvuyane was going to be one of those to be arrested, but he died.

The character of Siphiwe Mvuyane is significant because what he and his gang were doing had the effect of shaping the future of South Africa. If Siphiwe Mvuyane and his gang had achieved their objectives South Africa would have been different from what it is today. Siphiwe Mvuyane was at the coalface of the dynamics that sought to shape the future of South Africa. He can be regarded as the most feared person South Africa has ever had. He survived many attempts on his life so much so that a myth developed that he could not be hit by a bullet (i.e. he was protected by black magic from gunshots). He, for example, survived a hand grenade attack by an undercover MK operative, Sifiso Kunene. Mvuyane can also be understood as a unique individual who had extraordinary capabilities of self-defence.

Mvuyane was shot at the parking lot at the then University of Durban-Westville where he was attending a music concert. His murder case remains unresolved to this day. Some people are of the view that he died from homicide whereas others suspected suicide (details are still sketchy). The rationale for suicide is that people close to him were telling him that his arrest was imminent and that the ANC (his adversary) would be in power the following year (i.e. 1994). He felt betrayed and for fear of being in the hands of his enemies he allegedly committed suicide.

== Prominent incidents ==
A Durban multi-millionaire businesswoman, Shauwn Mpisane, lost her father during the period of the low intensity warfare in South Africa. Her father was Sipho Mkhize who was renowned as a warlord in the Umbumbulu area and was also a trained MK operative. Sipho Mkhize was shot dead in cold blood (first degree murder) by Siphiwe Mvuyane on 12 June 1991. Mvuyane had not been prosecuted for this murder at the time of his death.

Sipho Mkhize's son S'bu "Billy the Kid" Mkhize went berserk after the murder of his father. He went on a rampage and killed police officers in revenge for the death of his father Sipho Mkhize using military weapons such as RPG 7 rocket launchers to take out police vehicles in ambushes. S'bu Mkhize also hunted Mvuyane high and low but to no avail. It was common cause at the time that S'bu Mkhize was wanted by white policemen from CR Swart Square (now called Durban Central Police Station). Almost a year later after the death of his father, S'bu Mkhize was killed by the South African apartheid police after a high-speed chase which ended in Isipingo area in July 1992.

On 7 August 1990, Austin Zwane, a school pupil, was shot dead at Lamontville Township in front of his parents by Mvuyane accompanied by a group of four police officers. This is one of the murders which Mvuyane was to be prosecuted for, before he died. Mvuyane probably died in the early hours of Sunday, 9 May 1993. The court case for this murder and other crimes was set for the next day (Monday, 10 May 1993). Coincidentally, Austin Zwane attended Menzi High School, the same school Mvuyane had attended.

Bob Mabena, a popular radio personality in South Africa, was slapped in the face by Mvuyane at a music concert. Apparently Mabena was, at the concert, receiving attention from women at the expense of Mvuyane. This incident infuriated Mvuyane and got his blood to boil. He charged at Mabena and smacked him in the face.

On 26 April 1992, Mvuyane shot and paralysed Mfanafuthi Khumalo. It would appear that the killings gradually affected Mvuyane psychologically as he increasingly resorted to torture and irrational behaviour in resolving criminal cases he was investigating. As regards one of the cases Mvuyane was investigating, the victim (Khumalo) had this to say:

[Mvuyane] said to me I should sit on the sofa, and I asked him what he wanted from me. He said I should not ask him any questions, I must just sit on the sofa. And I moved from the bed and sat on the sofa. As I was sitting there he started insulting me. He abused me verbally and he started hitting me on the chest. When I asked him the reason why he was hitting me, he did not answer me. He just asked me where I was shot before. I said on the knee. As I was still answering him, he shot me on my other knee. He said to me he knew that I didn’t die due to gunshots. Then he gave me a knife and he said I should kill myself. And I have five wounds. I stabbed myself because he was pointing a gun at me, telling me to kill myself. And I threw the knife down and I told him that I was not able to kill myself. Then he continued to shoot me. He shot me on the right arm. I stayed there from 4 o’clock in the morning. He did not take me to the hospital. Then I realised that I should just pretend as if I was dead, because I realised that if he saw that I was not dead he was going to continue shooting me. I pretended that I was dead, and I was bleeding profusely. He left me there, believing that I was dead.

In another incident, Mvuyane opened fire on mourners at the funeral of Sifiso Zame on 2 October 1991. This was a random shooting and many people were injured as a result thereof and it remains unknown if any persons died from the shooting. Zame had been killed by the apartheid security police the previous week.

Mvuyane himself survived a bomb attack when he visited one of his many girlfriends at Mable Palmer residence at the then University of Natal in Durban. The undercover MK operatives had placed a limpet mine underneath his car. Somehow, Mvuyane survived the explosion. He had multiple lives like a cat. The undercover MK operatives began to use explosives against Mvuyane because they had failed dismally to kill him using conventional firearms (e.g. handguns and rifles). The communities were also of the view that Mvuyane must have received advanced military training from apartheid security forces, and was unfairly using the skills gained from that training in a civilian environment.

== Political context ==
Following the end of the Cold War and the collapse of the Soviet Union, the Western Powers, particularly the US, lost appetite in sustaining the South African apartheid government. The apartheid government was given an ultimatum to hand over political power to the indigenous people of the land, failing which further sanctions would be imposed. At the time, the apartheid government could not afford any further sanctions as the economy had already begun to cripple. The apartheid growth strategy had been rendered obsolete by the global dynamics at the time. This development meant that the apartheid government had to begin negotiations with its enemies in order to pave way for the democratic elections in the country, and this represented a paradigm shift in the apartheid government's political strategy - the new strategic objective was to achieve a favourable negotiated settlement. Despite the fact that the South African apartheid state was a formidable force in Africa in the same way as the State of Israel is in the present day in the Middle East, the South African apartheid government had to succumb to the Western pressure as the US did not want South Africa to be another source of conflict for the continuation of the Cold War.

Now the apartheid government had to extend an olive branch to the ANC so that a negotiated settlement could be reached. The ANC was the dominant party at the time from the side of liberation movements and enjoyed the majority of support from the country's populace. At the same time this change of strategy by the apartheid government represented the betrayal of other people who were fighting the ANC that the apartheid government had supported. Such people included Siphiwe Mvuyane who was fighting the ANC at grassroot level. It was not a complete betrayal as such because the apartheid government did pardon some of the offenders in terms of the First Indemnity Act of 1992 before the dawn of democracy, and one of the persons to be pardoned by this Act was Samuel Jamile (IFP leader and warlord). The apartheid government demonstrated its commitment to reform by releasing Nelson Mandela from prison, unbanning liberation movements and allowing exiles to return home. On the other hand, the apartheid government arrested people who were involved in political violence. At the time of his death Siphiwe Muvuyane had been suspended as a police officer and had been served a court indictment with more than 50 charges. This is the context in which the fall from grace and demise of Siphiwe Mvuyane should be understood.

== Death ==
Apparently it was late at night at the then University of Durban-Westville, where Siphiwe Mvuyane was attending a music concert, when he complained to his gang (which de facto served as his bodyguards) about drowsiness and fatigue. He was stressed and probably worried about the court case that was set for the following week. He wanted to go to his car at the parking lot to take a nap. His gang warned him about the possible presence of the undercover MK operatives, and his gang offered to accompany him to his car as a way of protection. Mvuyane refused the offer and pleaded with his gang not to accompany him. Stressed as he was, he eventually proceeded alone to his car. Few minutes later a gunshot was heard. His gang rushed to the parking lot, they found him in the driver's front seat sprawling. They rushed him to the nearest hospital and died on his way.

== Funeral and legacy ==
At his funeral held in Pietermaritzburg, journalists were precluded from taking photographs and being part of the funeral. John Woodroof, a journalist for Daily News was attacked at Mvuyane's funeral by mourners who were angry at the media. John Woodroof had written several newspaper articles that were critical of Siphiwe Mvuyane casting him in a negative light. It appears as if Mvuyane's mourners also held the media responsible for Mvuyane's downfall as Mvuyane had constantly received negative media coverage.

Although there is no official date for the end of the "low intensity warfare" in South Africa between the IFP and ANC (and a third force in-between), it can be argued that the end of this warfare was marked by the assassination of the IFP leader Thomas Shabalala, who was gunned down on 20 January 2005. The death toll of this warfare was estimated to be around 20 000 casualties.
