= Anton Fransch =

Anton 'Gamka' Fransch (c. 1969 – 17 November 1989), nom de guerre Mahomad, was a commander in uMkhonto we Sizwe. He was killed on 17 November 1989 in Cape Town by members of the South African Police and the South African Defence Force for his anti-apartheid activities, after a seven-hour siege in which he used hand-grenades and a machine gun.

== Cultural references ==
Fransch is the subject of The Funeral of Anton Fransch, a poem by Tatamkhulu Afrika, and the 2003 film Deafening Echoes, directed by Eugene Paramoer.
