= Johannesburg Magistrate's Court bombing =

Terrorist attack in South Africa

- Location: Magistrate's court, Johannesburg, Transvaal Province (modern Gauteng Province), South Africa
- Date: 20 May 1987
- Deaths: 4 police
- Injuries: 15
- Perpetrator: Members of the ANC's Umkhonto we Sizwe

The Johannesburg Magistrate's Court Bombing took place on 20 May 1987 in Johannesburg, in the former Transvaal Province, now in Gauteng. The bombing is often referred to as a massacre in which 4 South African Police members died and a further 15 civilians were injured. It was perpetrated by the ANC's Umkhonto we Sizwe (MK) para-military wing.

== Bombing ==
The bombing started with a limpet mine attack which lured policemen out of the Johannesburg Magistrates Court after it exploded. A police cordon was then established around the blast site and was then followed-up by a car bomb.

Three South African Police officers, Weyers Botha, Andre Duvenhage and Kobus Wilkens were killed in the second blast, while a fourth, Christoffel Botha died two days later in hospital from shrapnel wounds. At least 15 policemen and civilian's were injured.One of the policemen that survived the ordeal, was Constable Frederick Ernst who was in hospital for a month. He was released from hospital after a series of schrapnel removal operations and numerous skin grafts. Police would later find a remote control device in a flowerpot close to the bomb site. Eleven journalist that arrived at the scene were detained by police, accused of knowing the about the bomb beforehand.

It was established at a Truth and Reconciliation amnesty hearing in 1998 that a three man team under the instruction of Siphiwe Nyanda, commander of MK in the Transvaal based in Swaziland (since 2018 renamed to Eswatini) were responsible for the bombing. Solly Shoke supplied the limpet mine, remote control and explosives. Joseph Koetle was responsible for the delivery of the limpet mine and car bomb to the target and its remote detonation. William Mabele drove the second car.

The bomb was built the day before in Soweto and placed in a stolen VW Golf. On the day of the bombing, the Koetle drove the car bomb in the morning to the parking site outside the court and was driven back to Soweto by Mabele. Koetle returned to the site around 12h10 and armed the car bomb and planted the limpet mine in a rubbish bin nearby with a fifteen minute delay. He waited for the first explosion at a nearby café and after it detonated, watched for a police cordon to be set-up in an attempt to minimize civilian casualties before detonating the car bomb remotely.

== Significance ==
According to historian Padraig O’Malley this bombing was notable among the various Umkhonto we Sizwe (MK) operations due to the loss of life, according to his research hundreds of bombings and terrorist acts were committed with the vast majority having no fatalities. This could either be attributed to an increase in hostilities or an unfortunate accident.

== See also ==
- List of massacres in South Africa
