= Jane Duncan (academic) =

South African activist and academic

- Occupations: Academic, public intellectual, activist
- Employer: University of Glasgow
- Known for: Media freedom advocacy; former director of the Freedom of Expression Institute
- Title: Professor of Digital Society
- Awards: British Academy Global Professorship

Jane Duncan is an academic, public intellectual and activist. Currently, she is Professor of Digital Society at the University of Glasgow in Scotland, where she holds a British Academy Global Professorship.

She works on media freedom issues and is the former director of the Freedom of Expression Institute in Johannesburg.

== Publications ==
- South Africa: A Survey (PDF). Public broadcasting in Africa series. Open Society Initiative for Southern Africa. 2010. ISBN 978-1-920355-42-5. Archived from the original (PDF) on 31 October 2014.
- Media and Democracy in South Africa. HSRC Press. 1998. ISBN 978-0-7969-1854-3. co-edited with Mandla Seleoane
- Duncan, Jane (14 October 2014). The Rise of the Securocrats. Jacana Education. ISBN 978-1-4314-1075-0. to be published in October 2014
- "List or articles written by Jane Duncan for SACSIS.org.za". The South African Civil Society Information Service.
- "List of articles written by Jane Duncan for the Mail & Guardian". Mail & Guardian. Archived from the original on 6 June 2019.
- Duncan, Jane (2000). "Talk left, act right: what constitutes transformation in Southern African media?". Communicatio: South African Journal for Communication Theory and Research. 26 (2): 52–59. doi:10.1080/02500160008537912.
- Duncan, Jane (30 October 2003). "Another journalism is possible: Critical challenges for the media in South Africa" (PDF). Harold Wolpe Lecture Series.
- "Turning points in South African television policy and practice since 1990". Media Policy in a Changing Southern Africa: Critical Reflections on Media Reforms in the Global Age. UNISA Press: 39–72. 2010.
- Duncan, Jane (2009). "The uses and abuses of political economy: The ANC's media policy". Transformation: Critical Perspectives on Southern Africa. 70 (1): 1–30. doi:10.1353/trn.0.0039.
- Duncan, Jane (2016), Is South Africa reverting to a repressive state?, academia.edu
