= Andrew Zondo =

Umkhonto WeSizwe Operative

Andrew Sibusiso Zondo
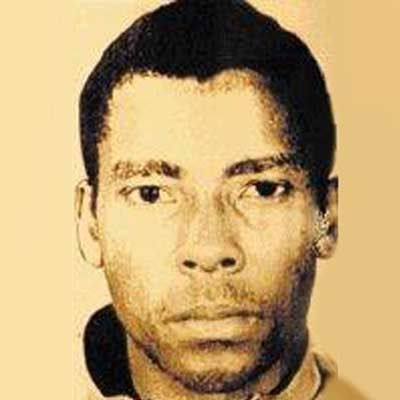
- Born: 1966/1967; South Africa
- Died: 9 September 1986 (aged 19); Pretoria Central Prison, South Africa
- Known for: Amanzimtoti bombing
- Status: Executed by hanging
- Motive: Retaliation for the government extrajudicially killing anti-apartheid activists
- Conviction: Murder
- Penalty: Death

Details
- Date: 23 December 1985
- Country: South Africa
- Locations: Amanzimtoti, Natal
- Killed: 5
- Injured: 161
- Weapon: Bomb

Andrew Sibusiso Zondo (1966/67 – 9 September 1986) was a South African Umkhonto we Sizwe (MK) operative. He detonated a bomb at Sanlam Centre in Amanzimtoti on 23 December 1985, killing five civilians.

== Early life ==
Andrew Sibusiso Zondo was born in 1966–67. He grew up at KwaMashu Township near Durban, and attended Ngazane Lower Primary School, Phakama Higher Primary and latterly Nhlakanipho High School in KwaMashu. Zondo did not complete high school.

Zondo developed an interest in politics at an early age. He joined the ANC when he was 16 years old, and went into exile. He initially wanted to further his studies in exile but ultimately trained as a guerrilla in Angola for the purpose of fighting South Africa's apartheid government.

== Amanzimtoti bombing ==
On 20 December 1985, the South African security forces carried out a raid in Lesotho, killing nine anti-apartheid activists. In retaliation, Durban MK operatives including Zondo placed a limpet mine at the Amanzimtoti Sanlam shopping centre on 23 December 1985. Two adults and three children were killed, and 161 other people were injured.

Irma Bencini (48) was one of those killed. Her stepdaughter, Debbie Scott, an Amanzimtoti resident, later said "I remember that day when we were all excitedly preparing for Christmas. I went to the then OK Bazaar near Sanlam Centre and my stepmother said she needed to go into the nearby supermarket. Within a few minutes I heard a loud bang and realized she was in danger. I rushed to the scene and found her body. She died instantly… My dad Mario has never been the same since then, and that incident will forever haunt us. Surely Zondo knew that planting a bomb in a supermarket was going to kill innocent people".

Oliver Tambo, the former president of the ANC, said that the killing of civilians was against ANC policy, and accordingly he disapproved of the bombing, but understood the reasons for its being carried out.

== Death ==
Zondo was captured on 29 December 1985 by the South African security forces. He was prosecuted, found guilty and sentenced to death. He was executed in Pretoria on 9 September 1986. The judge who sentenced him to death was Judge Johan Theron, often incorrectly cited as Judge Ramon Leon (the judge that originally found him guilty of the murders – after Zondo admitted to an accomplice that he was "disappointed in the body count, wishing it to have been higher") Two co-accused were acquitted in court but later extrajudicially executed by the Security Branch.

== Legacy ==
The Lovu Primary School was renamed Andrew Zondo Primary School in honour of Zondo as a cadre of Umkhonto we Sizwe (MK). This move was vehemently opposed by political opposition parties in South Africa on the basis that as a convicted killer, he was a bad example to young children.

Kingsway Road in Amanzimtoti was also renamed after Zondo. This development also drew criticism from political opposition parties. Their argument was that it was morally unjustifiable to honour a person who was a killer of innocent victims.

General Siphiwe Nyanda, former Chief of Staff of Umkhonto we Sizwe (MK), asked about Zondo's legacy, said "The fact that Andrew Zondo was engaged in such an act, [it] does not make him an outcast in our own vocabulary. He is still our hero, he is still a hero, I agree."

In 2022 a sign post in Amanzimtoti which carries his name was vandalised by two white male citizens as a female counterpart recorded the video.
