= UMkhonto weSizwe =

Armed wing of the African National Congress

uMkhonto weSizwe
- Founders: Nelson Mandela; Oliver Tambo; Walter Sisulu; Govan Mbeki; Joe Slovo
- Leaders: Nelson Mandela; Oliver Tambo; Walter Sisulu; Govan Mbeki; Joe Slovo; Lennox Lagu; Joe Modise; Chris Hani; Raymond Mhlaba; Moses Mabhida; Ronnie Kasrils; Isaac Lesiba Maphotho; Siphiwe Nyanda; Godfrey Ngwenya
- Dates active: 16 December 1961 – 16 December 1993
- Merged into: SANDF
- Allegiance: Tripartite Alliance: SACP
- Part of: ANC
- Wars: Angolan Civil War; South African Border War; Rhodesian Bush War; Internal resistance to apartheid

uMkhonto weSizwe (Xhosa pronunciation: [um̩ˈkʰonto we ˈsizwe]; abbreviated MK; lit. 'Spear of the Nation') was the paramilitary wing of the African National Congress (ANC), founded by Nelson Mandela in the wake of the Sharpeville massacre. Its objective was to bring armed pressure on South Africa's National Party-led government to abandon its policy of racial segregation, known as apartheid. It carried out attacks on military and civilian targets.

After warning the South African government in June 1961 of its intent to increase resistance if the government did not take steps toward constitutional reform and increase political rights, uMkhonto weSizwe launched its first attacks against government installations on 16 December 1961. uMkhonto weSizwe was subsequently banned and classified as a terrorist group by the South African government.

For a time it was headquartered in Rivonia, which was rural at that time but is now an affluent suburb of Johannesburg. On 11 July 1963, nineteen ANC and uMkhonto weSizwe leaders, including Arthur Goldreich, Govan Mbeki and Walter Sisulu, were arrested at Liliesleaf Farm, Rivonia. (The farm was privately owned by Arthur Goldreich and bought with South African Communist Party and ANC funds, as non-whites were unable to own a property in that area under the Group Areas Act.) The arrests were followed by the Rivonia Trial, in which ten leaders of the ANC were tried for 221 militant acts that the prosecution said were designed to "foment violent revolution". Wilton Mkwayi, chief of uMkhonto weSizwe at the time, escaped during the trial.

The organisation was formally disbanded in a ceremony at Orlando Stadium in Soweto, Gauteng, on 16 December 1993, although its armed struggle had been suspended earlier, during the negotiations to end apartheid.

== Motivations for formation ==
According to Nelson Mandela, all of the founding members of the uMkhonto weSizwe, including himself, were also members of the ANC. In his "I Am Prepared to Die" speech, delivered at the conclusion of the Rivonia Trial, Mandela outlined the motivations that led to the formation of uMkhonto weSizwe:

At the beginning of June 1961, after a long and anxious assessment of the South African situation, I, and some colleagues, came to the conclusion that as violence in this country was inevitable, it would be unrealistic and wrong for African leaders to continue preaching peace and non-violence at a time when the government met our peaceful demands with force.

This conclusion was not easily arrived at. It was only when all else had failed, when all channels of peaceful protest had been barred to us, that the decision was made to embark on violent forms of political struggle, and to form uMkhonto weSizwe. We did so not because we desired such a course, but solely because the government had left us with no other choice. In the Manifesto of uMkhonto published on 16 December 1961, which is exhibit AD, we said:

The time comes in the life of any nation when there remain only two choices – submit or fight. That time has now come to South Africa. We shall not submit and we have no choice but to hit back by all means in our power in defence of our people, our future, and our freedom.

Firstly, we believed that as a result of Government policy, violence by the African people had become inevitable, and that unless responsible leadership was given to canalise and control the feelings of our people, there would be outbreaks of terrorism which would produce an intensity of bitterness and hostility between the various races of this country which is not produced even by war. Secondly, we felt that without violence there would be no way open to the African people to succeed in their struggle against the principle of white supremacy. All lawful modes of expressing opposition to this principle had been closed by legislation, and we were placed in a position in which we had either to accept a permanent state of inferiority, or take over the Government. We chose to defy the law. We first broke the law in a way which avoided any recourse to violence; when this form was legislated against, and then the Government resorted to a show of force to crush opposition to its policies, only then did we decide to answer with violence.

The manifesto referred to by Mandela, adduced by the prosecution at his trial as Exhibit AD, included the statements:

Our men are armed and trained freedom fighters not "terrorists". We are fighting for democracy—majority rule—the right of the Africans to rule Africa. We are fighting for a South Africa in which there will be peace and harmony and equal rights for all people. We are not racialists, as the white oppressors are. The African National Congress has a message of freedom for all who live in our country.

The initial aim was to act only against such targets as power line pylons and avoid any injury or loss of life. However, later lethal attacks on various targets were performed, sometimes the victims were civilians. Such attacks include the Durban bar bombing, the Church Street Bombing, Johannesburg Magistrate's Court bombing and the Sasolburg refinery bombing.

The ANC later admitted to insufficient training of their guerilla fighters and apologized for targeting civilian infrastructure.

== Command structure (1961–1964) ==
In the six or so months between making the decision to form the organisation (June) and the first acts of sabotage (December), the MK high command set up regional commands in the main centres. The people chosen to be part of these commands were chosen either because they had the necessary technical or military skills or because they were members of Congress Alliance organisations.

=== Central (overall) command ===
- Nelson Mandela
- Oliver Tambo
- Walter Sisulu
- Govan Mbeki
- Joe Slovo
- Raymond Mhlaba (from 1962)
- Wilton Mkwayi (from 1963)

=== Johannesburg (later Transvaal) command ===
- Jack Hodgson
- Ahmed Kathrada
- Denis Goldberg
- Arthur Goldreich

=== Natal command ===
- Curnick Ndlovu
- Ronnie Kasrils (from 1963)

=== Western Cape command ===
- Looksmart Ngudle
- Fred Carneson

=== Eastern Cape command ===
- Vuyisile Mini

=== Border command ===
- Washington Bongco

=== Explosives command ===
- Jack Hodgson
- Harold Strachan (from 1962)

=== Ex-officio commanders ===
- Lambert Moloi (from 1964)
- Joe Modise (from 1964)
- Tom Sebina (from 1964)

== Domestic campaign ==
=== 1960s–1970s ===
In June 1961, Mandela sent a letter to South African newspapers warning the government that a campaign of sabotage would be launched unless the government agreed to call for a national constitutional convention. Six months later, on 16 December 1961, Mandela led uMkhonto weSizwe in launching its campaign.

The first target sabotaged was an electrical substation. This was followed by many more acts of sabotage over a year and a half, including attacks on government posts, machines and power facilities, and crop burning. At the Rivonia Trial, the government accused them of committing 193 acts of sabotage in total.

Opinions in the ANC were divided on the viability of launching a military campaign. For this reason, MK did not publicly associate itself with the ANC at first. Its initial attacks were "characterised by their simplicity": reflecting the Africans' lack of military training, and the fact that although many whites had military training, most had not seen service since the Second World War. The state responded with laws that allowed detention without trial and an unlimited power to ban organisations, and also by establishing military and civilian intelligence organisations.

MK began planning a campaign called "Operation O Mayibuye", or "Operation Mayibuye", from Liliesleaf Farm. The South African Heritage Portal describes how they were able to meet there:

"Goldreich and Harold Wolpe, a lawyer, used South African Communist Party funds to buy Liliesleaf Farm in Rivonia in 1961 for use as a secret meeting place. The secret life of the revolutionaries at Liliesleaf had a very brief flowering – the key years were 1961 to mid-1963. Arthur Goldreich lived as the tenant of Liliesleaf with his then wife Hazel and his two sons, Nicholas and Paul. They were white, the 'right colour' to belong in Rivonia, so their presence did not attract attention; this was the perfect cover.... The farm outbuildings became home to various key ANC black members who posed as 'servants' of the white Goldreich family. Here the leaders of a hoped for revolution developed a plan for guerrilla warfare (Operation Mayibuye) with its own printing press and a secret radio transmitter."

In 1962, Mandela went to Algeria, Egypt, and Ghana to get international backing for the group.

In December 1962, Looksmart Ngudle and Denis Goldberg helped to organise a training camp held at Mamre, outside Cape Town, later recognised as the first MK training centre inside South Africa; however it had to be abandoned early due to Security Police interest.

A lack of familiarity with the necessities of covert military work, and the reliance on high-profile leaders like Nelson Mandela, contributed to the South African state's ability to capture the organisation's leadership at their Rivonia headquarters outside Johannesburg at the end of 1962. This effectively neutralised MK within South Africa for the next decade. However, the organisation had established itself—and its key relationship as a disciplined part of the ANC—and did not disappear.

The early 1970s were a low point for the ANC in many ways, including in the military sphere. Attempts to rebuild uMkhonto weSizwe inside South Africa resulted in many losses, although, as noted by the Military History Journal, some members, including Chris Hani, were able to remain undetected for a long period. Meanwhile, MK cadres had access to a growing range of military training opportunities in Algeria, Egypt and the Soviet Union and other communist-bloc countries.

The Soweto uprising of 1976 led to a large exodus of young black men and women. Anxious to strike back at the apartheid regime, they crossed the border to Rhodesia to seek military training. This enabled uMkhonto weSizwe to rebuild an army — one capable of attacking prestigious targets such as the refineries at Sasolburg.

On 24 February 1977, a bomb exploded at the Daveyton Police Station, causing only superficial damage. On 14 December, guerrillas attacked the Germiston police station. On 10 March 1978, a bomb exploded outside the offices of the Bantu Affairs building in Port Elizabeth, killing one civilian and wounding three others. On 21 August 1978, B. Mayeza, personnel member of the Bureau of State Security was shot dead in Umlazi, Durban. On 9 December 1978, an explosive blast severely damaged the Soweto Community Council building.

On 14 January, seven members clashed with SAP (South African Police) near Zeerust, one member was captured, others escaped over Botswana border. On 23 January, an explosion damaged the railway near New Canada, Gauteng. The next day, a large quantity of explosives on the line were found and defused, between Fort Beaufort and King William's Town, Eastern Cape. In February, Sergeant Benjamin Letlako, a Police Special Branch member, is shot dead in Katlehong. On 15 April, an improvised device was discovered and defused on a railway line near Soweto. In 5 May, guerrillas opened fire in the Moroka Police Station, killing one and wounding three more policemen and three civilians. Next, an explosive device was found in a railway in Eastern Transvaal. On 15 November, members of MK attacked the Orlando SAP Station, leaving two officers dead and other two wounded. In the same day, the house of the Lt Magezi Ngobeni of SAP Special Branch was attacked with grenades, leaving five children wounded. In the next month, a railway near Alice, Eastern Cape was damaged by a blast.

=== 1980s: Attacks ===
List of attacks attributed to MK and compiled by the Committee on South African War Resistance (COSAWR) between 1980 and 1983.

==== First attacks in the decade ====
On 4 January, the Morebeng SAP Station was attacked by an explosive device, leaving one officer injured. Days later, members of the MK took 25 hostages in a bank in Pretoria, the next confrontation between security forces and MK members left five dead (three attackers), and approximately 20 wounded. In March, MK shot dead two officers in Bophutatswana.

In June 1980, MK members attacked the Booysens Police Station, leaving two officers wounded. In 2000, the Amnesty Committee of the Truth and Reconciliation Commission (TRC) granted amnesty for the attack. In the night of 31 May – 1 June, MK members attacked two Sasol oil from coal plants, leaving important material damages.

There was a lull until 21 April 1981, when the MK attacked a substation in Durban with limpet mines. In this period, the attacks with explosives continued. On 29 October, a grenade attack was reported against the West Rand police station, Gauteng Province. The following day, the MK attacked the Consul of the House of Transkei with explosives, leaving only material damage. On 21 November MK members shot dead an officer in Chiawelo, Gauteng. On 29 October, a grenade attack was reported against the West Rand police station, Gauteng Province. The following day, the MK attacked the Consul of the House of Transkei with explosives, leaving only material damage. In this period, attacks with explosives continued.

On 27 May, the MK took credit for another attack in Durban, destroying a South African Defence Force recruitment building. In June of the same year, the MK took credit for the arson attack against the headquarters of the Progressive Federal Party, which caused material damage, the abandonment of a limpet mine in a fuel depot in Alberton as well as other sabotage of railways. On 21 July, an attack on the Arnot Power Station in Pretoria was reported, with at least six explosions recorded in three facilities.

On 11 August, MK members attacked the Voortrekker military base in Pretoria with grenade launchers. On 1 November, MK members attacked a border post with Swaziland, occupied by the South African Defense Forces (SADF), which was destroyed by a rocket and grenade attack. Days later, attacks against substations in Pretoria are attributed, between 12 and 14 October.

On 7 January 1982, MK tried to attack the West Rand Board of Administration, Soweto. Explosive attacks on administrative offices followed in the following weeks. On 28 May, MK claimed responsibility for the attack on a fuel depot and power transformer, Hectorspruit, Mpumalanga Province. In June MK attacked railways in Durban, and detonated an explosive in the offices of the Presidential Council, leaving one civilian killed. In 28 June that MK attacked railways in Vryheid and Scheepersnek.

On 5 June, the MK bombs kill one person when the explosive blasts in a lift at the offices of the presidents Council in Cape Town. Weeks later, two bombs cause extensive damage to the railway depot, pump station, stores and vehicles in Scheepersnek. A triple blasts in the Drakensberg Administration offices in Pietermaritzburg.

On 8 November, an improvised device causes important damage at the Mobil fuel storage depot in Mkuze. Days later, MK militants uses RPG-7s to attack a rural police station and temporary South African Army garrison at Tonga.

On 8 January 1982, uMkhonto weSizwe attacked Koeberg Nuclear Power Station while it was still under construction. Damage was estimated at R 500 million and the commissioning of the power station was put back by 18 months. The bomber was Rodney Wilkinson, who had previously represented South Africa in international fencing tournaments; Renfrew Christie had provided the necessary intelligence.

==== 1983: Church Street bombing ====
In 1983, the Church Street bomb was detonated in Pretoria near the Air Force headquarters, resulting in 19 deaths and 217 injuries.

==== 1985: Amanzimtoti bombing ====
In the 1985 the Amanzimtoti bombing on the Natal South Coast, five civilians were killed and 40 were injured when uMkhonto weSizwe cadre Andrew Sibusiso Zondo detonated an explosive in a rubbish bin at a shopping centre shortly before Christmas. In a submission to the Truth and Reconciliation Commission (TRC), the ANC stated that Zondo's act, though "understandable" as a response to a recent South African Defence Force raid in Lesotho, was not in line with ANC policy. Zondo was executed in 1986.

==== 1986: Durban beach-front bombing ====
In the 1986 Durban beach-front bombing, a bomb was detonated in a bar, killing three civilians and injuring 69. Robert McBride received the death penalty for this bombing, which became known as the "Magoo's Bar bombing". McBride received amnesty and became a senior police officer.

==== 1987: Johannesburg bombings ====
In 1987, an explosion outside a Johannesburg court killed three police officers and injured a further 15; a court in Newcastle had been attacked in a similar way the previous year, injuring 24. Also in 1987, a bomb exploded at a military command centre in Johannesburg, killing one person and injuring 68 personnel.

==== Other attacks ====
The armed struggle continued with attacks on a series of soft targets, including a bank in Roodepoort in 1988, in which four civilians were killed and 18 injured. Also in 1988, a bomb outside a magistrate's court killed three. At the Ellis Park rugby stadium in Johannesburg, a car bomb killed two and injured 37 civilians. A multitude of bombs at restaurants and fast food outlets, including Wimpy Bars, and supermarkets occurred during the late 1980s, killing and wounding many people. Wimpy were specifically targeted because of their perceived rigid enforcement of many apartheid laws, including excluding non-whites from their restaurants.

=== 1985–1987: Landmine campaign ===
From 1985 to 1987, there also was a campaign to place anti-tank mines on rural roads in what was then the Northern Transvaal. This tactic was abandoned due to the high rate of civilian casualties—especially among black labourers. The ANC estimated that there were 30 landmine explosions resulting in 23 deaths, while the government submitted a figure of 57 explosions resulting in 25 deaths.

=== Findings by the Truth and Reconciliation Commission ===
The Truth and Reconciliation Commission found that the use of torture by uMkhonto weSizwe was "routine", as were executions "without due process" at ANC detention camps. This was particularly true in the period of 1979–1989, although torture was not official ANC policy. It called the Durban bombing a "gross violation of human rights".

The TRC also noted in its report that although "ANC had, in the course of the conflict, contravened the Geneva Protocols and was responsible for the commission of gross human rights violations…of the three main parties to the [South African] conflict, only the ANC committed itself to observing the tenets of the Geneva Protocols and, in the main, conducting the armed struggle in accordance within the international humanitarian law".

== Foreign military activities ==
=== Angola ===
In January 1969, the ANC declared its solidarity with the People's Movement for the Liberation of Angola (MPLA) and pursued close military relations with that party, then involved in the Angolan War of Independence. Both movements were drawn into a practical and ideological friendship because of their shared links with the Soviet Union through the communist parties of their respective nations. At the First International Conference of Solidarity with the Fighting People of Southern Africa and the Portuguese Colonies, organised by the Afro-Asian People's Solidarity Organisation and the World Peace Council, the MPLA and ANC entered into a formal military alliance together with the South West African People's Organisation (SWAPO), the Zimbabwe African People's Union (ZAPU), and the African Party for the Independence of Guinea and Cape Verde (PAIGC). This became known as the Khartoum alliance.

The ANC-MPLA alliance assumed new significance in the mid-1970s with Angolan independence. After consolidating power with Cuban support, the MPLA granted MK permission to establish training facilities in Angola. The primary MK base in Angola was located at Novo Catengue, where intakes of up to 500 recruits were trained by Cuban military advisers. Between 1976 and 1979, over 1,000 MK guerrillas were trained at Novo Catengue. In recognition of Cuba's role in supervising the training programme, the third MK intake to muster out was named the "Moncada Detachment". There were also a number of smaller MK training camps established throughout Angola, namely at Quibaxe. Aside from Cuba, the Soviet Union also contributed some instructors at the request of Oliver Tambo; between 1976 and 1991, 200 Soviet military personnel served at various MK camps in Angola as training staff.

The ANC and MK presence in Angola re-ignited its alliance with SWAPO and its own armed wing, the People's Liberation Army of Namibia (PLAN). PLAN and MK frequently shared facilities in Angola and coordinated the transportation of supplies and war materiel.

In 1984, there was a series of mutinies in MK's Angolan camps that were suppressed by the Mbokodo, the ANC's internal security service. During this time, the ANC detained and executed a number of MK dissidents suspected of subversion or disloyalty. In one case mutineers killed ANC members and after the mutiny was suppressed seven mutineers were executed (with further executions only halted after the personal intervention of Oliver Tambo).

MK's presence in Angola inevitably embroiled it in the Angolan Civil War. In August 1983, an MK battalion was deployed against the National Union for the Total Independence of Angola (UNITA) insurgents near Kibashe. In 1986, three battalions of newly trained MK recruits were deployed to guard FAPLA rear areas during Operation Alpha Centauri. MK also participated in the Battle of Cuito Cuanavale, fighting against a joint South African and UNITA expeditionary force during Operation Hooper and Operation Packer. At least 100 MK cadres were killed during the Battle of Cuito Cuanavale, making that engagement of enormous symbolic importance, as it was the largest single loss of life in MK's history. Furthermore, MK's prestige inside South Africa was greatly enhanced by its participation in a conventional battle, and apparent willingness to directly confront a South African military force.

=== Rhodesia (Zimbabwe) ===
During the Rhodesian Bush War, MK was closely allied with the Zimbabwe People's Revolutionary Army (ZIPRA), the armed wing of ZAPU. MK became interested in using ZIPRA's infiltration routes to smuggle supplies to its fighters in South Africa, and organised a joint expedition with the latter in August 1967. A combined MK-ZIPRA force was largely eliminated by the Rhodesian Security Forces during Operation Nickel, and the survivors driven back across the border into Botswana and Zambia. Historian Rocky Williams assesses that MK and ZIPRA "fought well under difficult conditions" and that although the incursion failed, the Rhodesian authorities were forced to rely on clandestine military assistance from South Africa to counter them.

Concerning MK's alliance with ZIPRA, Oliver Tambo stated: "We have had close political relations with ZAPU, and these developed into relations at the military level, until we were in a position to fight together. This close alliance is the first of its kind one can recall in the liberation movement. In no previous instance has there actually been fighting by freedom fighters drawn from different territories."

== Military equipment ==
MK received nearly all its military equipment from the Soviet Union, although other COMECON member states such as East Germany which were sympathetic to the ANC's cause also provided the movement with small quantities of materiel. The SACP was able to use its political contacts in the Soviet government to obtain these weapons, and was primarily responsible for MK's logistics from the beginning of the armed struggle. Soviet ordnance played a crucial role in the MK's sabotage campaign and in guerrilla engagements with the South African security forces. Military equipment was usually smuggled into South Africa from neighbouring states where the ANC was operating in exile. Once inside the country, they were cached in major urban centers where the ANC enjoyed a large political following. MK established enormous arms depots in Botswana, Mozambique, and Swaziland to facilitate these operations, and also had smaller quantities of weapons cached in Angola, Zambia, and Tanzania.

Soviet arms deliveries to MK, valued collectively at 36 million rubles, began in 1963 and ceased in 1990. Despite the cessation of Soviet military aid, MK had still amassed enough conventional weapons inside South Africa to mount an effective urban guerrilla campaign as needed by 1991. The movement's preexisting arsenal was deemed sufficient to continue operations against the South African state for the foreseeable future in the event that ongoing negotiations to dismantle the apartheid system failed. MK cadres were primarily armed with Soviet AK-47 assault rifles and SKS carbines. By the late 1980s, it was beginning to supplement both these weapon types with the slightly more modern AKM assault rifle firing the same 7.62×39mm cartridge. MK also received over 6,000 handguns of various types, primarily derivatives of the TT-33 pistol.

MK possessed some heavy weapons, namely 90 man-portable, single-tube Grad-P rocket launchers. The Soviet Union also supplied MK with over 40 9K32 Strela-2 surface-to-air missile launchers and 60 9M14 Malyutka anti-tank missile systems.

After MK was disbanded, the movement passed its logistical records to the newly integrated South African National Defence Force (SANDF) to ensure that the stored equipment was properly inventoried and disposed of.

== In popular culture ==
- In 1984, musician Prince Far I's album Umkhonto we Sizwe (Spear of the Nation) was released (posthumously) in an act of solidarity with the uMkhonto weSizwe.
- In 1987, a benefit hardcore compilation album Viva uMkhonto! was released on the Dutch label Konkurrel. It featured Scream, Challenger Crew, Morzelpronk, Social Unrest, The Ex, Depraved, Victims Family, B.G.K., Rhythm Pigs, Everything Falls Apart, Kafka Prosess, S.C.A.*, and 76% Uncertain.
- Zimbabwean-born African-American author and filmmaker M. K. Asante Jr. embraced the initials M. K. after uMkhonto weSizwe.
- Dave Matthews Band song "#36" is dedicated to Chris Hani, the assassinated chief of staff of the uMkhonto weSizwe and the leader of the South African Communist Party, and includes the refrain: "Hani, Hani, won't you dance with me?"

== Notable members ==
In addition to co-founder Nelson Mandela, notable members include:

- Tatamkhulu Afrika
- Sipho Binda
- Anton Fransch
- Jacob Zuma
- Denis Goldberg
- Harry Gwala
- Chris Hani
- Samuel Hlongwane
- Ronnie Kasrils
- Moses Kotane
- Tryphina Mboxela Jokweni
- Lennox Lagu
- Moses Mabhida
- Ashley Kriel
- Robert McBride
- Mac Maharaj
- Dikgope Madi
- Solomon Mahlangu
- James Mange
- Isaac Lesiba Maphotho
- Rudzani Maphwanya
- Jerry Masisi
- Vusumuzi Masondo
- Davidson Masuku
- Lawrence Mbatha
- Govan Mbeki
- Thabo Mbeki
- Duma Mdutyana
- Raymond Mhlaba
- Wilton Mkwayi
- Joe Modise
- Thandi Modise
- Thabiso Mokhosi
- Lambert Moloi
- Alex Moumbaris
- Fabian Msimang
- Mavuso Msimang
- Refiloe Johannes Mudimu
- Phila Portia Ndwandwe
- Godfrey Ngwenya
- Wilson Nqose
- Siphiwe Nyanda
- Vejaynand Ramlakan
- Tom Sebina
- Aubrey Sedibe
- Solly Shoke
- Walter Sisulu
- Joe Slovo
- Marion Sparg
- Oliver Tambo
- Lindile Yam
- Tony Yengeni
- Andrew Zondo
- Joe Gqabi

== Number of deaths ==
South African police statistics indicate that, between 1976 to 1986, approximately 130 people were killed by guerrillas. Of those killed, about thirty were members of various security forces and one hundred were civilians. Of the civilians, 40 were white and 60 black.

About eleven ANC members were killed in cross-border raids by the SADF.

== Awards ==
The following medals and awards, some with post-nominal titles, were retrospectively defined and awarded to members of MK:

- Conspicuous Leadership Star (CLS)
- Decoration for Merit (Gold) (DMG)
- Merit Medal (Silver) (MMS)
- Merit Medal (Bronze) (MMB)
- Service Medal (Gold)
- Service Medal (Silver)
- Service Medal (Bronze)
- South Africa Service Medal
- Star for Bravery (Gold) (SBG)
- Star for Bravery (Silver) (SBS)
- Operational Medal for Southern Africa

== See also ==
- Day of Reconciliation
- Internal resistance to apartheid
- South African Border War
- Military history of South Africa
- Necklacing
- UMkhonto weSizwe Party
