= Church Street, Pretoria bombing =

1983 car bombing in South Africa

Coordinates: 25°44′47″S 28°11′26″E

The Church Street bombing was a car bombing on 20 May 1983 in the South African capital Pretoria by uMkhonto weSizwe (MK), the paramilitary wing of the African National Congress (ANC). The bombing killed 19 people, including the two perpetrators, and wounded 217.

== Attack ==
The attack consisted of a car bomb set off outside the Nedbank Square Building, which was rented by the South African Air Force, on Church Street West, Pretoria, at 4:30 pm on 20 May 1983. The target was supposedly South African Air Force (SAAF) headquarters, but as the bomb was set to go off at the height of rush hour, those killed and wounded included civilians. The bomb exploded ten minutes earlier than planned, killing two of the perpetrators, Freddie Shangwe and Ezekial Maseko, along with 17 other people. At least 20 ambulances took the dead and wounded to hospitals.

== Truth Commission hearing ==
In submissions to the Truth and Reconciliation Commission (TRC) in 1997 and 1998, the ANC revealed that the attack was orchestrated by a special operations unit of the ANC's Umkhonto we Sizwe (MK), commanded by Aboobaker Ismail. At the time of the attack, they reported to Joe Slovo as chief of staff, and the Church Street attack was authorised by Oliver Tambo.

The ANC's submission said the bombing was in response to a South African cross-border raid into Lesotho in December 1982, which killed 42 ANC supporters and the assassination of Ruth First, an ANC activist and the wife of Joe Slovo, in Maputo, Mozambique. It claimed that 11 of the casualties were SAAF personnel and hence a military target. The legal representative of some of the victims argued that as administrative staff including telephonists and typists they could not accept that they were a legitimate military target.

Ten MK operatives, including Aboobaker Ismail, applied for amnesty for this and other bombings. The applications were opposed on various grounds, including that it was a terrorist attack disproportionate to the political motive. The TRC found that the number of civilians versus military personnel killed was unclear. Police statistics indicated that seven members of the SAAF were killed. The commission found that at least 84 of the injured were SAAF members or employees. Amnesty was granted by the TRC in 2000.

Nelson Mandela, who was serving time in prison at the time of the terror attack, wrote about its violent nature in his autobiography: “It was precisely because we knew that such incidents would occur that our decision to take up arms had been so grave and reluctant.”

== See also ==
- List of massacres in South Africa
- Internal resistance to apartheid
