= R351 (South Africa) =

Regional route in South Africa

Regional route R351
- R351 route map

Route information
- Length: 157 km (98 mi)

Major junctions
- South-west end: R67 near Mhlangeni
- R67 in Whittlesea; N6 near Cathcart
- North-east end: R61 near Bolotwa

Location
- Country: South Africa

Highway system
- Numbered routes of South Africa
← R350	→ R352

The R351 is a Regional Route in the Eastern Cape province of South Africa. It connects the R67 west of Mhlangeni with Bolotwa via Whittlesea and Cathcart.

== Route ==
From the R67, it heads north, through the Katberg Pass to Katberg. It then goes through the Devil's Bellows pass before veering north-east to Sada and Whittlesea. Here the route crosses the R67 again, at a staggered junction. It heads east to the N6 north of Cathcart. It is co-signed with the N6 heading south. At Cathcart the route diverges from the N6, and heads east then north to reach its terminus at the R61 just south of Bolotwa.
