= Resha (surname) =

Resha is an Egyptian surname. Notable people with the surname include:

- Maggie Resha (1923–2003), South African nurse and dissident, wife of Robert
- Robert Resha (1920–1973), South African journalist and dissident

== See also ==
- Resha (disambiguation)
