= 1920 in South Africa =

- Decades: 1900s; 1910s; 1920s; 1930s; 1940s
- See also: List of years in South Africa

The following lists events that happened during 1920 in South Africa.

== Incumbents ==
- Monarch: King George V
- Governor-General and High Commissioner for Southern Africa:
  - The Viscount Buxton (until 19 November).
  - Prince Arthur of Connaught (from 20 November).
- Prime Minister: Jan Smuts.
- Chief Justice: James Rose Innes.

== Events ==
January

- 10 – The League of Nations is established as the Treaty of Versailles goes into effect.

February

- 1 – The South African Air Force (SAAF) is established, the second autonomous Air Force in the world after the Royal Air Force (RAF).

November

- 20 – Prince Arthur of Connaught is appointed the 3rd Governor-General of the Union of South Africa.

December

- 17 – South Africa is granted a League of Nations Class C mandate over South West Africa.

== Births ==
- 12 February – Raymond Mhlaba, anti-apartheid activist and politician. (d. 2005)
- 20 February – Zoe Gail, singer and actress. (d. 2020)
- 9 March – Robert Resha, journalist and political dissident. (d. 1974)
- 20 March – Lionel Bernstein, anti-apartheid activist and political prisoner (d. 2002)
- 8 April – Vuyisile Mini, anti-apartheid activist and politician. (d. 1964)
- 12 May – Gerald Stapleton, Battle of Britain fighter pilot. (d. 2010)
- 11 June – David Millin, movie director, producer, and cinematographer. (d. 1999)
- 11 July – Edison Ntsanwisi, politician and Chief Minister of Gazankulu. (d. 1993)
- 30 July – Harry Gwala, anti-apartheid activist and politician. (d. 1995)
- 8 August – Nimrod Sejake, labour leader and activist. (d. 2004)
- 11 September – Hymie Barsel, political activist. (d. 1987)
- 12 September – Michiel Daniel Overbeek, amateur astronomer and prolific variable star observers. (d. 2001)
- 24 December – Richard Maponya, entrepreneur and property developer. (d. 2020)

== Deaths ==
- 11 December – Olive Schreiner, author and feminist, in Cape Town. (b. 1855)

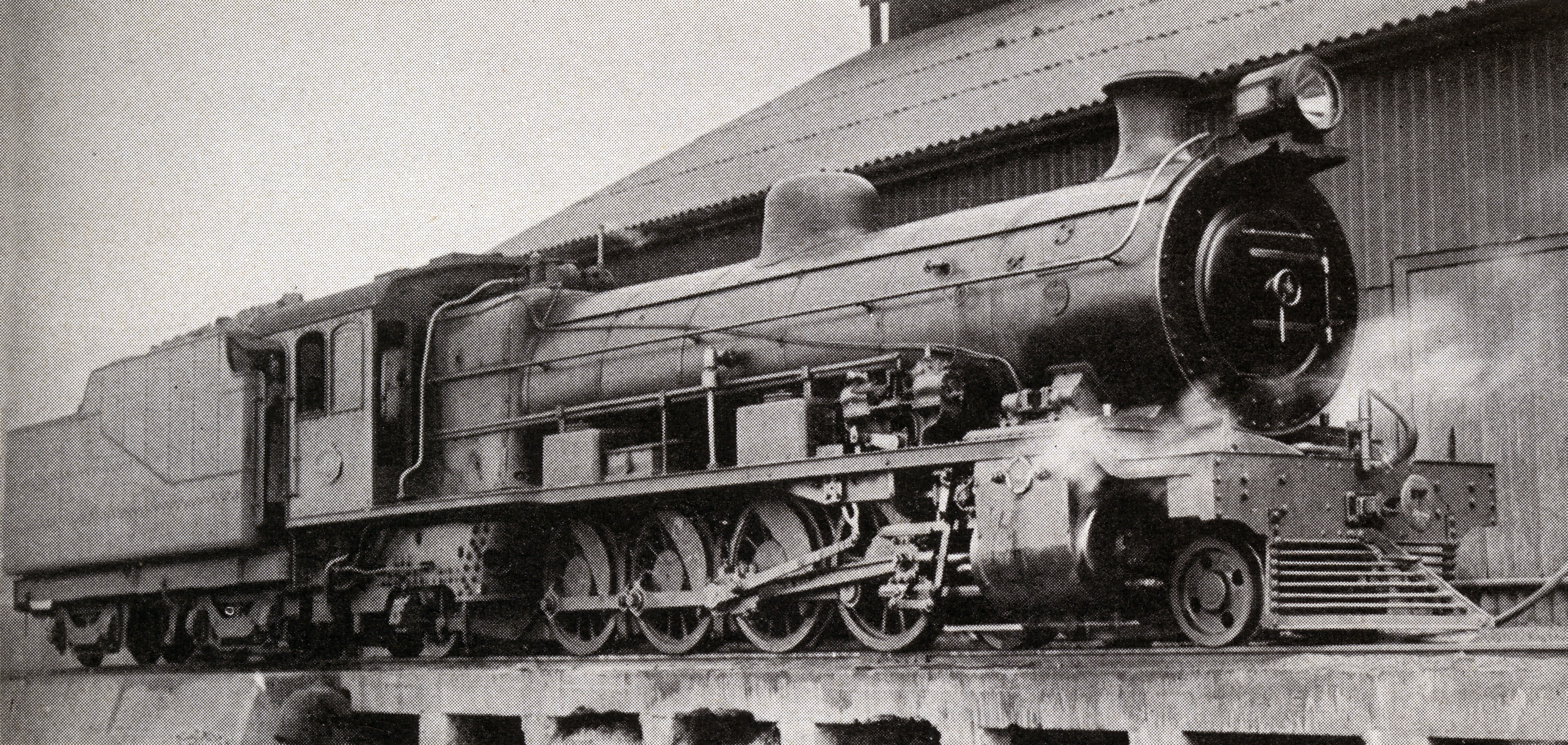
Class 12B

== Railways ==
=== Locomotives ===
- The South African Railways places thirty Class 12B 4-8-2 Mountain type steam locomotives in mainline service.
