= 1915 in South Africa =

- Decades: 1890s; 1900s; 1910s; 1920s; 1930s
- See also: List of years in South Africa

The following lists events that happened during 1915 in South Africa.

== Incumbents ==
- Monarch: King George V.
- Governor-General and High Commissioner for Southern Africa: The Viscount Buxton.
- Prime Minister: Louis Botha.
- Chief Justice: James Rose Innes

== Events ==
February

- 4 – The Maritz rebellion of disaffected Boere against the government of the Union of South Africa ends with the surrender of remaining rebels.

May

- 1 – General Louis Botha, Prime Minister of South Africa, leads the army in the occupation of German South West Africa.

July

- 9 – Dr Theodore Seitz, governor of German South West Africa, surrenders to General Louis Botha at the farm Khorab, between Otavi and Tsumeb.

September

- The International Socialist League of South Africa is established in Johannesburg.

== Births ==
- 2 February – Abba Eban, Israeli foreign affairs minister. (d. 2002)
- 26 February – Elisabeth Eybers, poet. (d. 2007)
- 10 May – Beyers Naudé, cleric, theologian and activist. (d. 2004)
- 2 December – Marais Viljoen, politician and State President. (d. 2007)
- 13 December – B.J. Vorster, politician, Prime Minister and State President. (d. 1983)

== Railways ==
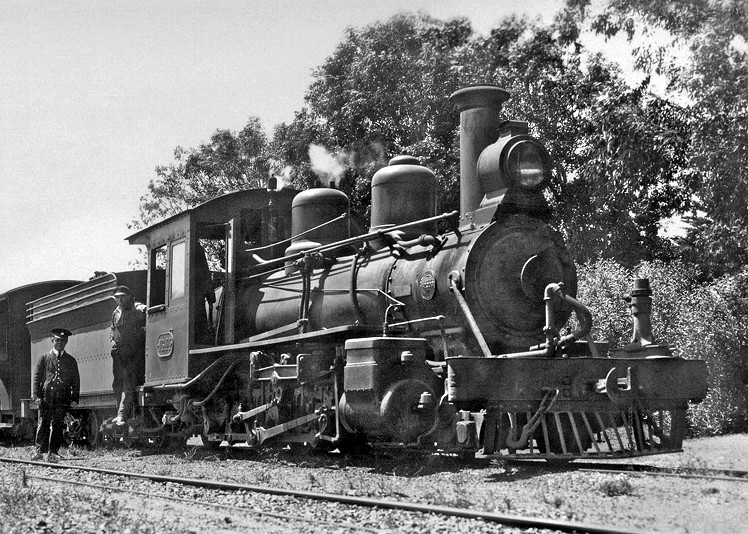
Class NG9

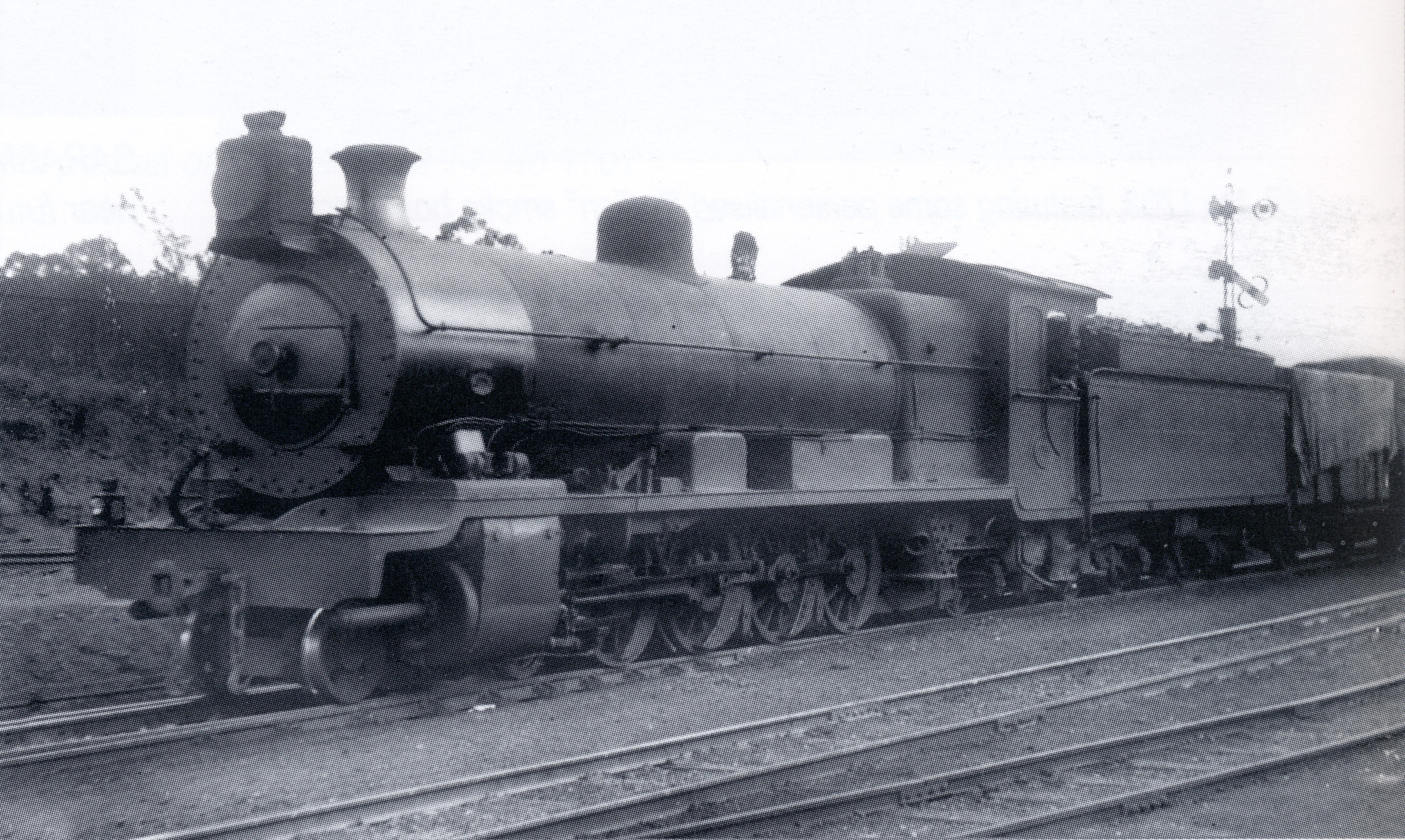
Class 14B

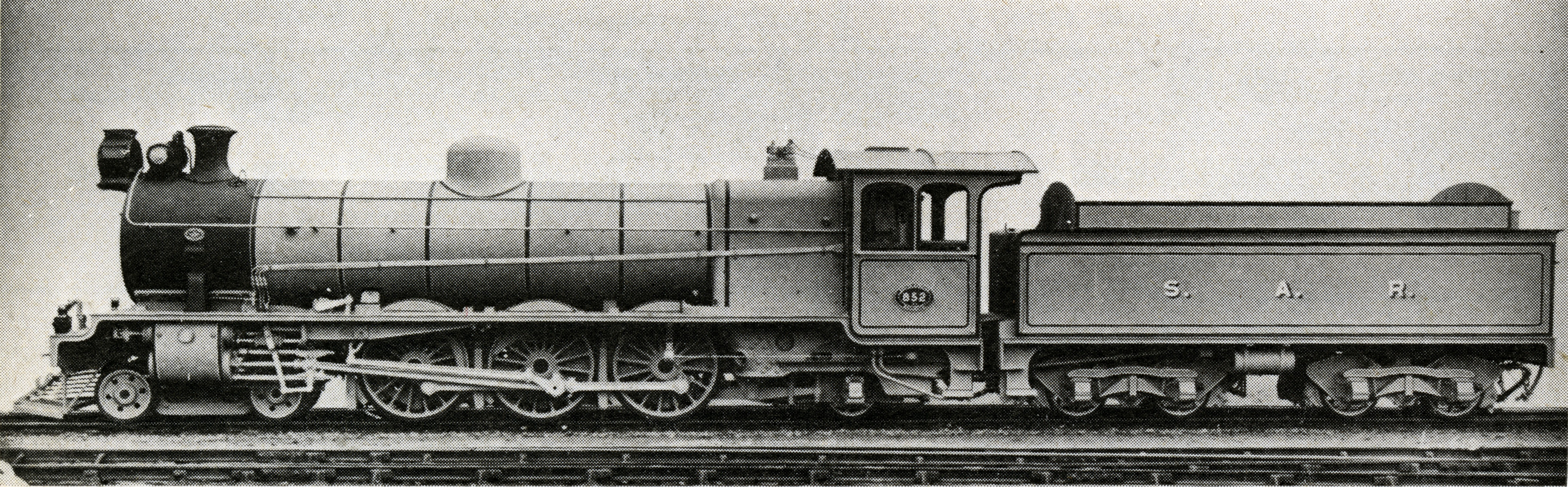
Class 16A

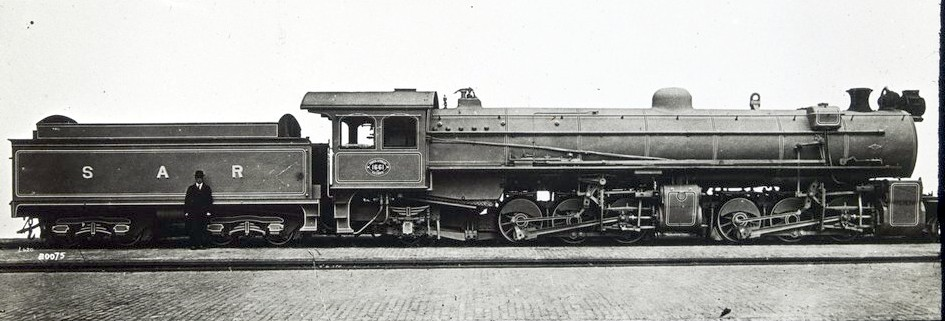
Class MH

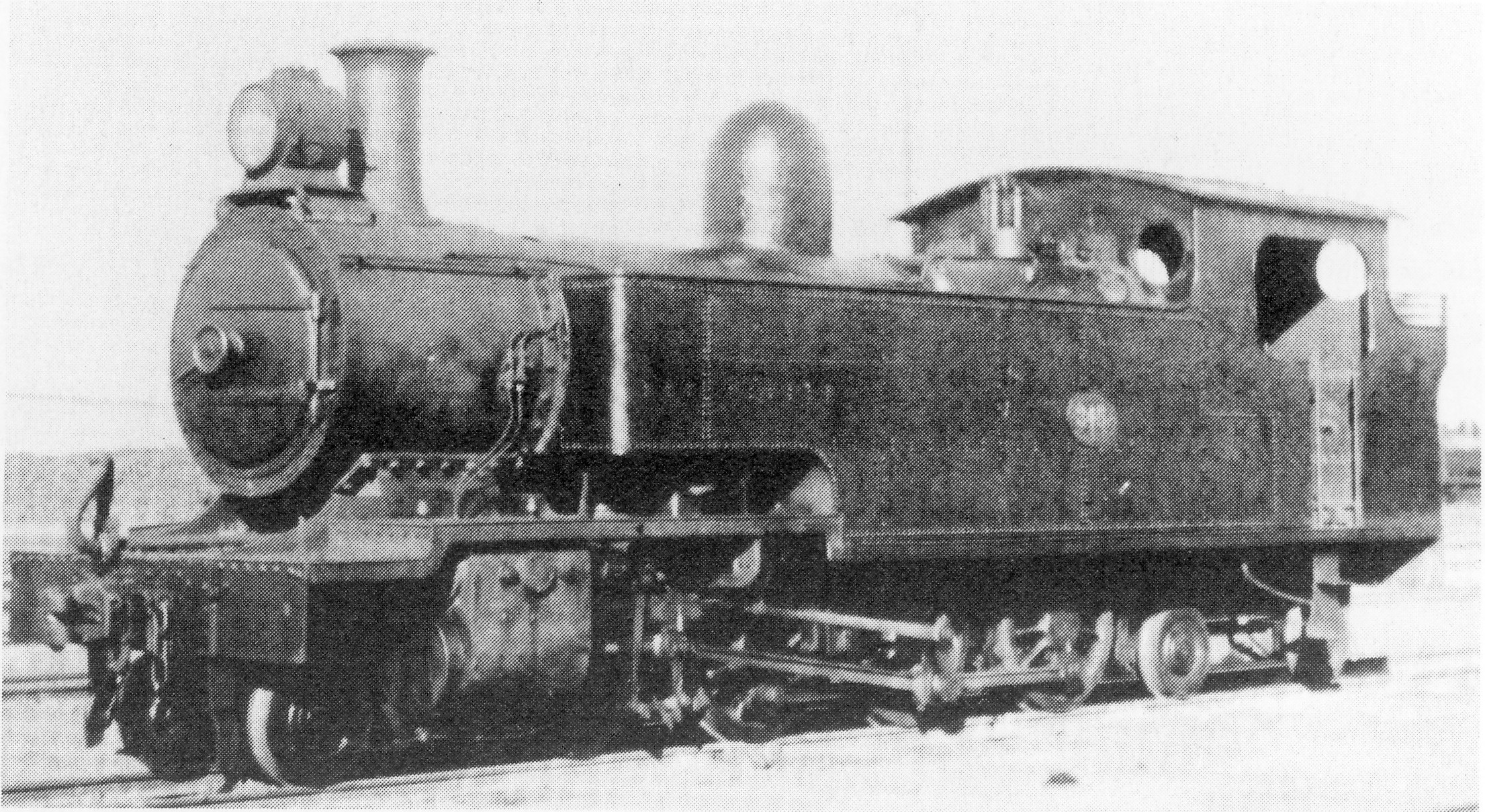
Class J

=== Railway lines opened ===
- 12 April – Natal – Dalton to Glenside, 12 miles 13 chains (19.6 kilometres).
- 31 May – Free State – Westleigh to Vierfontein, 52 miles 27 chains (84.2 kilometres).
- 31 May – Free State – Fauresmith to Koffiefontein, 32 miles 71 chains (52.9 kilometres).
- 30 June – Cape – Klipdale to Protem, 10 miles 10 chains (16.3 kilometres).
- 1 August – Cape – Prieska to South West Border, 231 miles 59 chains (372.9 kilometres).
- 1 August – Cape – Walvisbaai to Swakop River (at Swakopmund), 22 miles 42 chains (36.3 kilometres).
- 4 August – Transvaal – Tzaneen to Soekmekaar, 55 miles 16 chains (88.8 kilometres).
- 16 August – Natal – Paddock to Izingolweni (Narrow gauge), 11 miles 72 chains (19.2 kilometres).
- 5 October – Natal – Schroeders to Bruyns Hill, 14 miles 76 chains (24.1 kilometres).
- 15 November – Cape – Birdfield to Klawer, 1 mile 26 chains (2.1 kilometres).
- 29 November – Cape – Motkop to New England, 19 miles 63 chains (31.8 kilometres).
- 1 December – Cape – Carnarvon to Williston, 85 miles 6 chains (136.9 kilometres).

=== Locomotives ===
Narrow gauge

Two narrow gauge locomotive types enter service in South Africa:

- Thirteen out-of-service Mozambican Falcon 4-4-0 narrow gauge tender steam locomotives are acquired by the Union Defence Force for use in South Africa to replace narrow gauge South African Railways (SAR) locomotives that are being commandeered for the war effort in German South West Africa. They will later be designated Class NG6 on the SAR.
- The first of six narrow gauge 4-6-0 steam locomotives enter service on the Avontuur Railway. They will later be designated Class NG9 by the SAR.

Cape gauge

Five Cape gauge locomotive types enter service on the South African Railways (SAR):

- In May six Rhodesian 7th Class 4-8-0 locomotives are purchased by the SAR and reclassified, five of them to Class 7D and the remaining one to Class 7B.
- Fifteen Class 14B 4-8-2 Mountain type locomotives without superheating.
- Two Class 16A 4-6-2 Pacific type four-cylinder simple expansion passenger locomotives.
- Five Class MH 2-6-6-2 Mallet articulated compound steam locomotives, the largest and most powerful locomotive in the world on Cape gauge at the time.
- Six Class J 4-6-4 tank steam locomotives on the Natal South Coast.
