= 1922 in South Africa =

- Decades: 1900s; 1910s; 1920s; 1930s; 1940s
- See also: List of years in South Africa

The following lists events that happened during 1922 in South Africa.

== Incumbents ==
- Monarch: King George V.
- Governor-General and High Commissioner for Southern Africa: Prince Arthur of Connaught.
- Prime Minister: Jan Smuts.
- Chief Justice: James Rose Innes.

== Events ==
March

- 10-14 – The Rand Rebellion, a strike by white mine workers which began on 28 December 1921, becomes open rebellion against the state.
- 15 – Samuel Long, labour pioneer and striker, is arrested.

April

- 1 – The South African Railways take control of all railway operations in South West Africa.

October

- 27 – Southern Rhodesians vote in a referendum and reject union with South Africa.

November

- 17 – Rand Rebellion strikers Samuel Long, Herbert Hull and David Lewis are hanged for murder.

December

- 6 – The prophet Nontetha is arrested by authorities fearful of a repeat of the Bulhoek Massacre

== Births ==
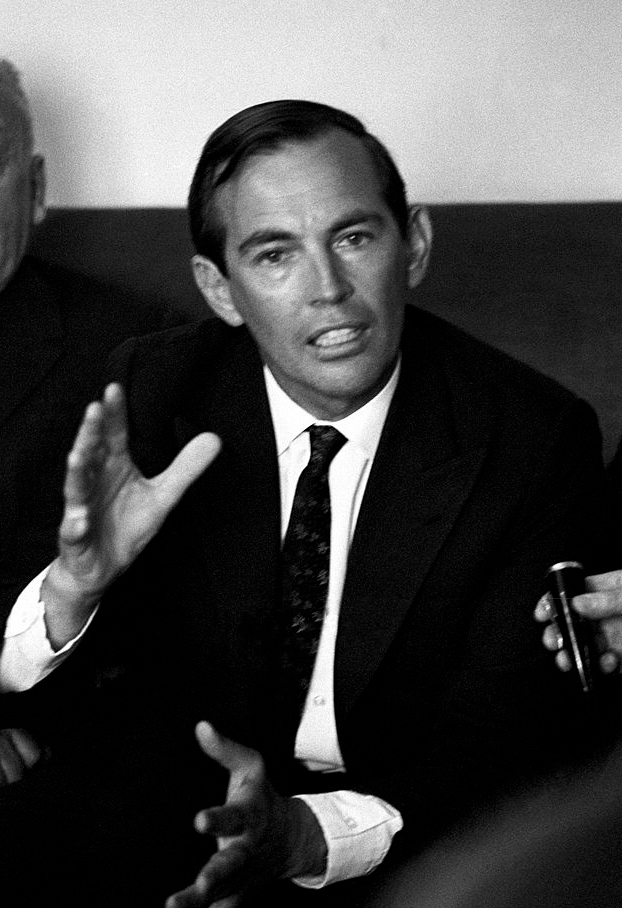
Chris Barnard

- 6 May – Elize Botha, first wife of State President P. W. Botha. (d. 1997)
- 22 May – Looksmart Khulile Ngudle, politician, (d. 1963)
- 13 October – Rahima Moosa, politician, (d. 1993)
- 22 October – Thomas Nkobi, politician, (d. 1994)
- 5 November – Sydney Kentridge, lawyer, judge and member of the English Bar.
- 8 November – Christiaan Barnard, cardiac surgeon and heart transplant pioneer. (d. 2001)

== Railways ==
=== South West African lines ===
- 1 April – The SAR inherits five existing former German Colonial railway lines in SWA.
  - Union Border to Swakop River (at Swakopmund), 771 miles 73 chains (1,242.3 kilometres).
  - Seeheim to Lüderitz, 197 miles 69 chains (318.4 kilometres).
  - Karibib to Tsumeb (Narrow gauge), 259 miles 28 chains (417.4 kilometres).
  - Otavi to Grootfontein (Narrow gauge), 56 miles 73 chains (91.6 kilometres).
  - Otjiwarongo to Outjo (Narrow gauge), 45 miles 37 chains (73.2 kilometres).

=== Railway lines opened ===
- 1 April – SWA – Kolmanskop to Bogenfels, 74 miles (119.1 kilometres).

=== Locomotives ===
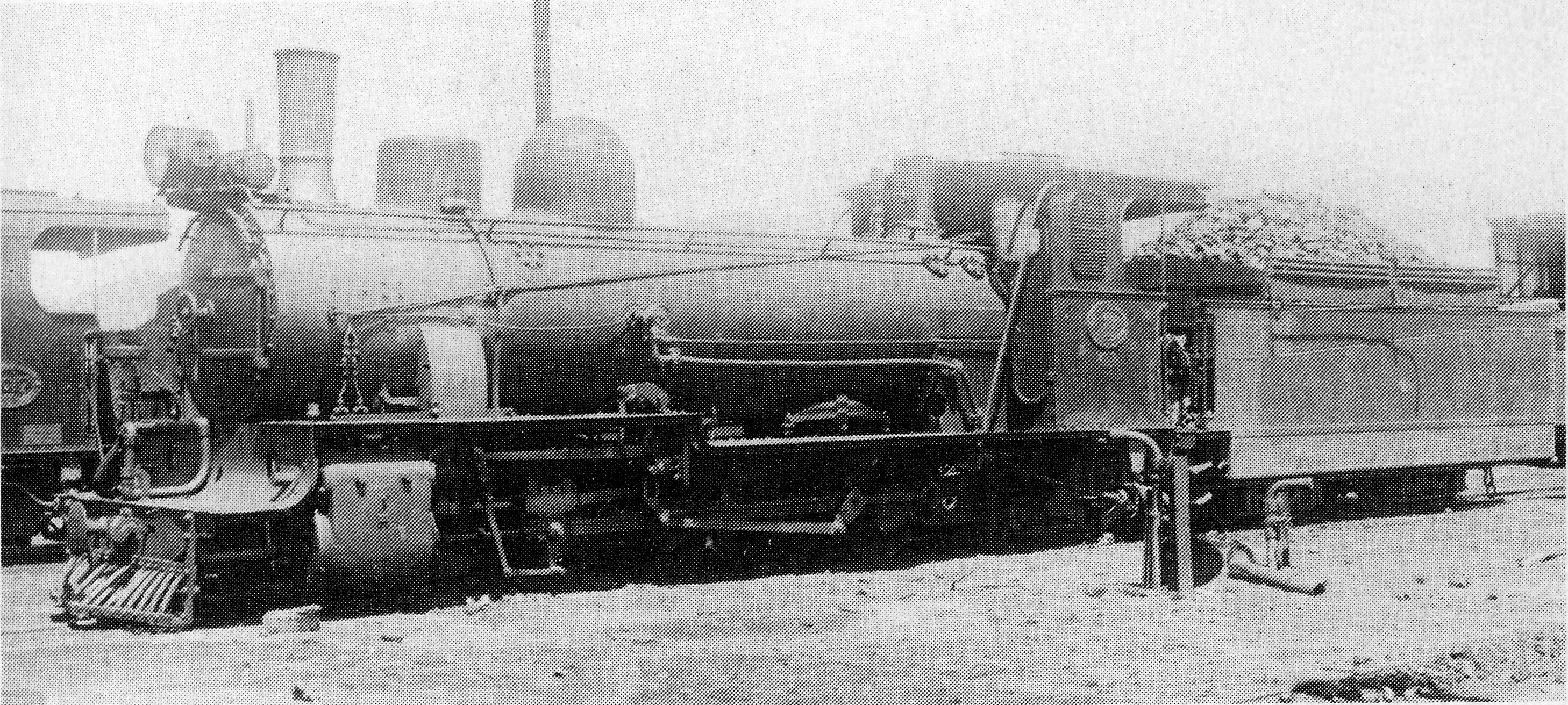
Class NG5

- 1 April – The SAR inherits seven former German Colonial narrow gauge and Cape gauge steam locomotive types in SWA.
  - One narrow gauge Class Ha 0-6-2 tank locomotive, acquired in 1904 for the Otavi Mining and Railway Company.
  - Six narrow gauge Class Hb 0-6-2 tank and tank-and-tender locomotives, acquired between 1905 and 1908 for the Otavi Mining and Railway Company.
  - Three narrow gauge Class Hd 2-8-2 locomotives, acquired in 1912 for the Otavi Mining and Railway Company for use on the line from Swakopmund to Karibib.
  - Two narrow gauge 0-6-2 Jung tank locomotives, introduced on the Otavi Mining and Railway Company in 1904.
  - One pair of narrow gauge 0-6-0 Zwillinge twin tank locomotives, introduced by the Swakopmund-Windhuk Staatsbahn in 1898.
  - Five Cape gauge Eight-Coupled Tank locomotives, introduced by the Lüderitzbucht Eisenbahn in 1907.
  - Nine Cape gauge Eight-Coupled Tender locomotives, introduced by the Staatsbahn Lüderitzbucht-Keetmanshoop in 1911.
- The SAR places six new Class NG5 2-8-2 Mikado steam locomotives in service on the narrow gauge Otavi branch in SWA.
