= Stuart Commission =

Internal inquiry of the South Africa's African National Congress in 1984

The Commission of Inquiry into Recent Developments in the People's Republic of Angola
- Date: February 13, 1984 - March 14, 1984
- Location: Angola
- Also known as: Stuart Commission
- Participants: James Stuart (real name Hermanus Loots; chairperson); Aziz Pahad; Sizakele Sigxashe; Antony Mongalo; Mbuyiselo Mntu Dwyili
- Outcome: Identified low level of political consciousness among cadres; Recommended improvements in living conditions and welfare in camps; Recommended establishment of a Revolutionary Tribunal

The Stuart Commission, formally called The Commission of Inquiry into Recent Developments in the People's Republic of Angola, was an internal inquiry of the African National Congress (ANC) established in 1984 to investigate disturbances, examine administrative and operational issues, and recommend corrective measures within its armed wing, Umkhonto we Sizwe (MK).

The commission's findings highlighted concerns about violations of human rights over the treatment of cadres and undemocratic practices, which forced the party to take major and comprehensive reforms within the structures, which shaped the Kabwe Conference, 1985.

The Commission was established as a result of increasing internal unrest in the early 1980s, primarily due to perceived mismanagement and the harsh treatment of its members. The 1984 mutiny, which involved MK cadres protesting against their conditions and leadership, prompted the ANC to form the Stuart Commission to address these grievances.

== The 1984 mutiny ==
During the early 1980s, unrest erupted in the ANC's Angola-based camps, culminating in what was known as the 'Mkatashinga mutiny' at Viana camp in December 1983. This revolt was characterized by cadres demanding deployment into South Africa rather than fighting in Angola and also protested the conduct of the Mbokodo, the ANC’s internal security wing.

Amid the mutiny, a self-organized rebel leadership emerged known as the 'Committee of Ten', elected by the cadres themselves to represent their grievances to the ANC leadership.

The mutiny gained significant attention on 12 January 1984 when ANC president Oliver Tambo and a high-level NEC delegation made an emergency visit to Caculama training centre, Angola, following days of gunfire at Kangandala, 80km away from Caculama. The shootings, carried out by Umkhonto we Sizwe (MK) combatants, were a protest - not aimed to harm - but to demand urgent attention to grievances, such as their refusal to fight UNITA in the Angolan Civil War and wanted deployment to fight the South Africa government.

Only Tambo, Joe Slovo (MK chief of staff) and Chris Hani (army commissar) were welcomed to handle the matter. The combatants admired Slovo for daring operations and valued his intellectual writings on democracy; Hani was respected for his early military campaigns (Wankie Campaign) in Rhodesia but criticised for lack of major operations in South Africa. The rebels’ anger targeted Joe Modise, MK commander since 1969, whom the mutineers accused of corruption and military failure; Mzwandile Piliso, feared chief of security, notorious for suppressing dissent and Andrew Masondo, a national commissar accused of corruption, sexual exploitation and running the infamous Quatro prison.

The mutiny was rooted in long-standing suppression of democracy in MK, especially since the arrival in exile of the post-1976 Soweto uprising youth activists. Discontent had flared earlier in 1979 at Fazenda camp, north of Quibaxe where cadres, promised deployment to South Africa, were instead kept in Angola for endless training.

First Quatro inmates - Ernest Mumalo, Solly Ngungunyana, and Drake, were captured in Luanda after attempting to resign from the ANC. They were beaten and detained; Solly was freed after two years, Ernest in 1984, while Drake’s fate is unknown. Only Piliso, Modise and Masondo from the NEC had access to Quadro, which led to accusations that they were responsible for the mysterious disappearance or deaths of imprisoned cadres.

Since 1979, after the destruction of the Nova Katenga camp, morale, discipline and political military training had sharply declined in the structures. Cadres faced poor nutrition, inadequate shelter, shortages of uniforms and medical care, and a lack of recreation and cultural facilities while leaders enjoyed these. Harsh and often destructive disciplinary practices, coupled with elitism and abuses by camp administrators, intensified resentment.

The Committee of Ten was led by Zaba Maledza, a former SASO activist and radio propagandist, and included Sidwell Moroka (Omry Makgale), a former personal bodyguard to Tambo and district chief of staff in Luanda, Jabu Mofolo, a political commissar of the Amandla Cultural Ensemble, Bongani Matwa, a former camp commissar in Camalundi, Kate Mhlongo (Nomfanelo Ntlokwana), a member of Radio Propaganda in Luanda, Grace Mofokeng, also serving on Radio Propaganda, Moses Thema (Mbulelo Musi), a Moscow Party School alumnus and head of the political department at Caxito camp, Sipho Mathebula (E. Mndebela), a former battalion commander on the Eastern Front, Mwezi Twala (Khotso Morena), and Simon Botha (Sindile Velem). They were later accused by the ANC leadership of fomenting division and challenging the authority of the movement, leading to their arrest and imprisonment in ANC detention facilities. Several members of the committee spent years in prison under harsh conditions, with some subjected to torture and prolonged solitary confinement and others, like Maledza and Edward Masuku, were killed. A few were eventually released and reintegrated into ANC structures, while others remained estranged from the movement, later speaking publicly about the abuses they endured.` Notably, two survivors of the ANC camps, Sipho Phungulwa and Bongani Ntshangase were killed by the ANC in the post-exile era for speaking publicly about the abuses. Phungulwa was shot dead in Umtata in June 1990 and Ntshangase was shot dead in Msinga in May 1992.

Back in 1984, in an attempt to protect themselves from an anticipated crackdown, the Committee of Ten and their supporters at Viana camp displayed placards reading "No to Bloodshed, We Need Only a Conference" and sought to alert the press, though journalists were blocked from access. Two members of the Radio Propaganda, Diliza Dumakude and Zanempi Sihlangu, were killed by ANC security while on their way to Radio Freedom. Soon after, the Angolan presidential army surrounded the camp, and fighting broke out, resulting in the deaths of MK combatant Babsey Mlangeni and a soldier of the presidential army. A ceasefire was brokered through negotiations between the presidential army's national chief of staff, a Colonel Ndalo, and the Committee of Ten, with assurances of no victimisation. Support for the mutiny grew when rebels from Caculama camp, led by Bandile Ketelo (Jacky Molefe), joined, giving the movement a majority of MK’s trained forces in Angola. However, the Angolan authorities reneged on earlier agreements, allowing the ANC security to re-enter the camp heavily armed, arresting on 16 February 1984 about thirty guerrillas, including the Committee of Ten, at gunpoint and taken to Luanda’s Maximum State Security Prison, where they endured inhumane conditions including starvation, lack of water and squalor. Cadres like Vuyisile Maseko (real name Xolile Siphunzi) were injured during the mutiny while resisting arrest and allegedly attempted to detonate a grenade in a vehicle carrying Hani and Modise. Hani reportedly ordered his execution, but Modise insisted he "must go and suffer first." Maseko remained imprisoned when most mutineers were released in December 1988.

== Findings and recommendations of the Commission ==
=== Findings ===
The Stuart Commission found serious issues within MK camps in Angola, including elitist and undemocratic hierarchical administration, widespread abuse of authority, mismanagement and harsh disciplinary measures that caused injuries and demoralisation to cadres. Camp conditions were found to be poor, with inadequate food, medical services, clothing and recreational facilities. Political education and military training were insufficient, and security personnel often used force indiscriminately while leadership contact with cadres was minimal, such as senior leaders taking time to visit camps.

=== Recommendations ===
The Commission recommended improving relationships between administrators and rank-and-file members, ending the "slave-servant" relationship and special privileges, reducing bureaucracy and nepotism, and introducing fair and constructive disciplinary measures. Camp conditions, including housing, food, sanitation, and medical care, needed upgrading, along with access to recreation, literature, and cultural activities. Political and military training should be strengthened, and structured deployment policies introduced based on merit and operational needs. Security functions required clear roles and accountability, and leadership presence in camps was essential to maintain morale and connection with the ANC’s central structures.recommendations.
