= 1914 in South Africa =

- Decades: 1890s; 1900s; 1910s; 1920s; 1930s
- See also: List of years in South Africa

The following lists events that happened during 1914 in South Africa.

== Incumbents ==
- Monarch: King George V.
- Governor-General and High Commissioner for Southern Africa:
  - The Viscount Gladstone (until 27 July).
  - Baron De Villiers (acting, 27 July to 2 September).
  - Sir James Rose Innes (acting, 2 to 8 September).
  - The Viscount Buxton (from 8 September).
- Prime Minister: Louis Botha.
- Chief Justice: Baron De Villiers then Sir James Rose Innes

== Events ==
January

- 8 – A railway strike is declared in the Transvaal and Orange River Colony.

April

- 23 – The Afrikaans language receives official recognition when Cornelis Jacobus Langenhoven addresses the English caucus of the Cape Provincial Council.

July

- 1 – The National Party is formed in Bloemfontein.
- 18 – Mahatma Gandhi leaves South Africa for the last time, sailing out of Cape Town for England on board the SS Kinfauns Castle.

September

- 8 – The Viscount Buxton is appointed the second Governor-General of the Union of South Africa.
- 10 – South Africa declares war on Germany.
- 13 – South African troops open hostilities in German South-West Africa with an assault on the Ramansdrift police station.
- 15 – The Maritz Rebellion against the government of the Union of South Africa begins.

Unknown date

- The steamship Clan Stuart is blown ashore between Glencairn and Simon's Town in the Cape Province.
- The Kimberley mine or "Big Hole" is closed.
- South Africa's government agree to many of the Indians' demands. Discriminatory taxes on Indian traders are abolished, the legality of non-Christian marriages is recognized and the continued immigration of free Indians is permitted.
- A new lighthouse is built at Cape Point.

== Births ==
- 14 March – Frederick Samuel Modise, leader of IPHC (d. 1998)
- 3 July – Pat Pattle, World War II fighter pilot. (d. 1941)
- 20 February – John Charles Daly, South African-born journalist, game show host (d. 1991)
- 9 December – Shmuel Katz, Israeli writer, historian and journalist. (d. 2008)

== Deaths ==
- 15 September – Koos de la Rey, Boer War general, is shot dead at a police roadblock. (b. 1847)

== Railways ==
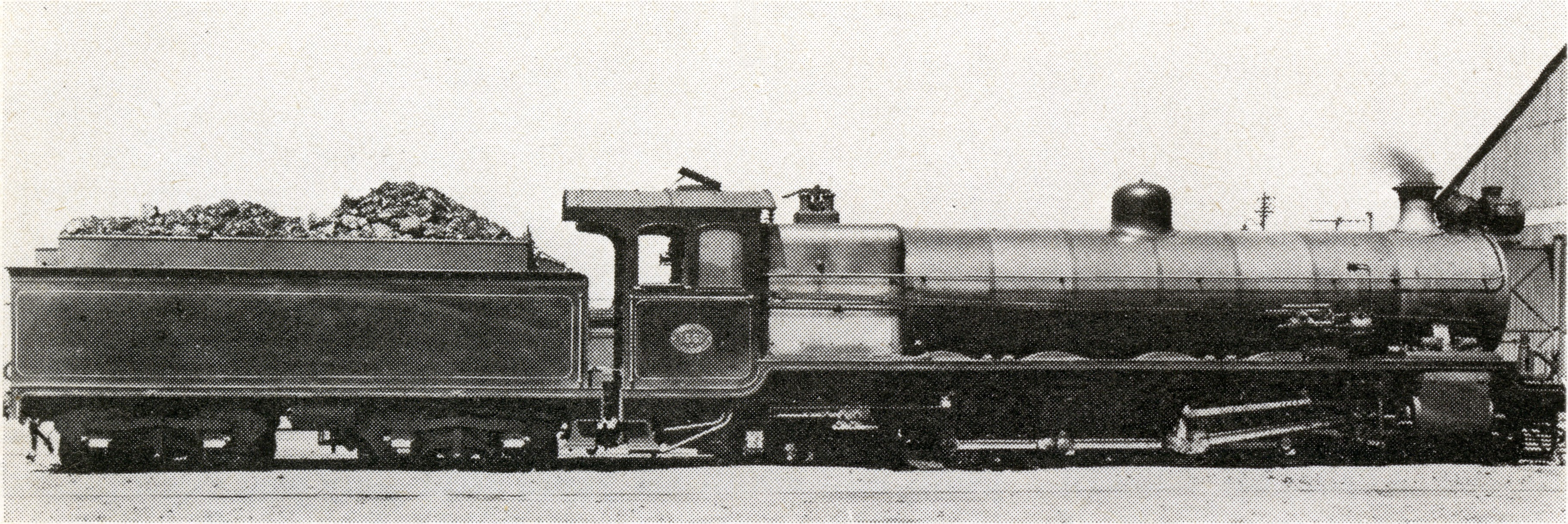
Class 15

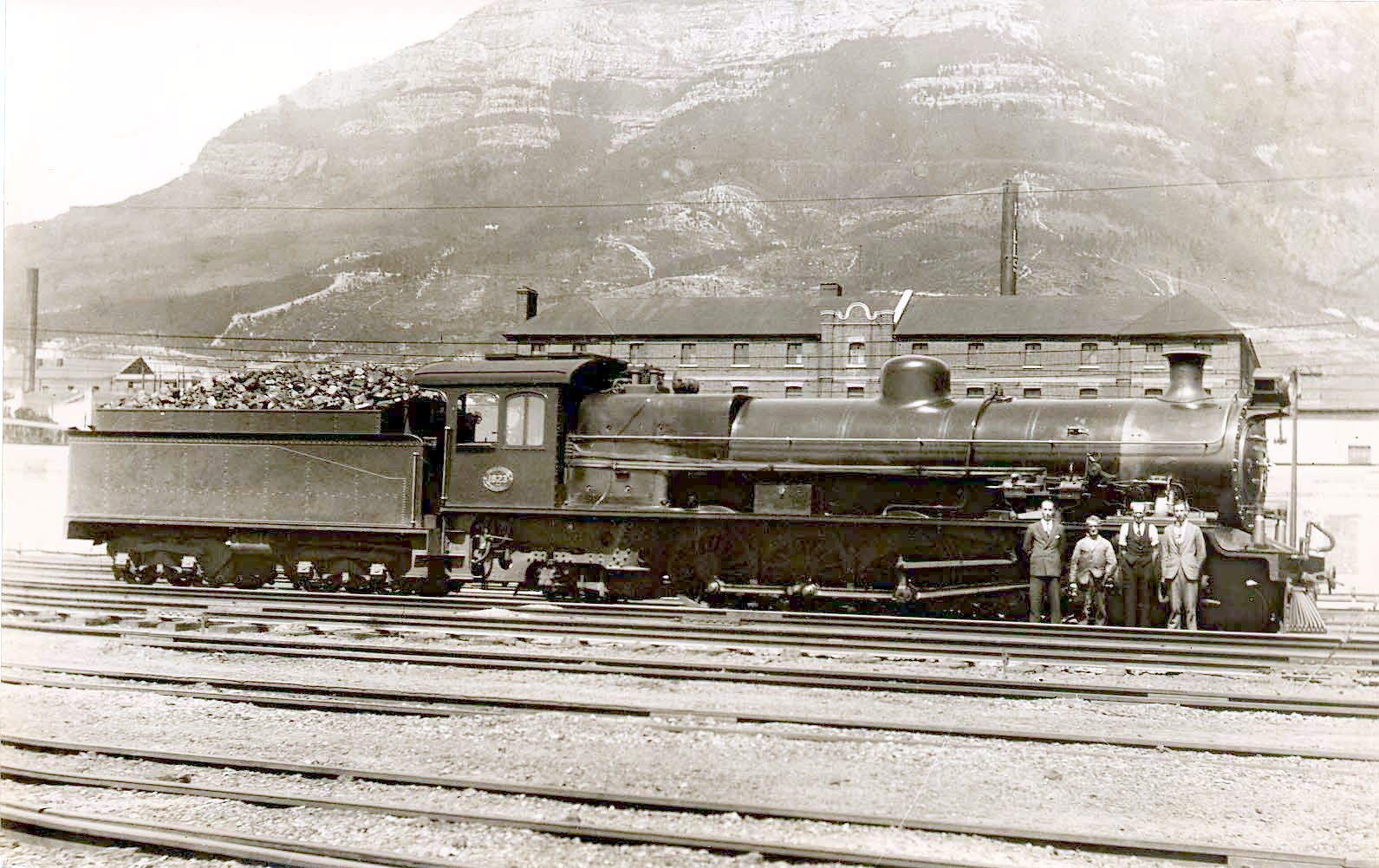
Class 15A

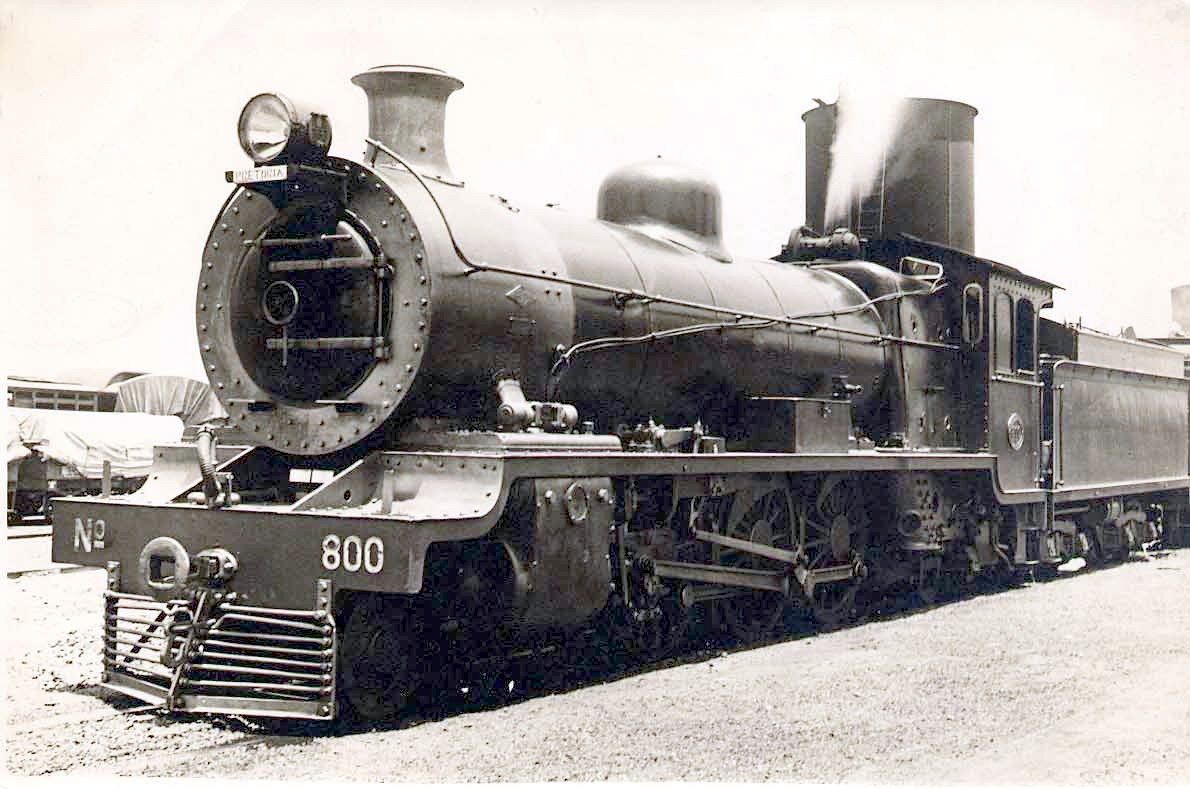
Class 16

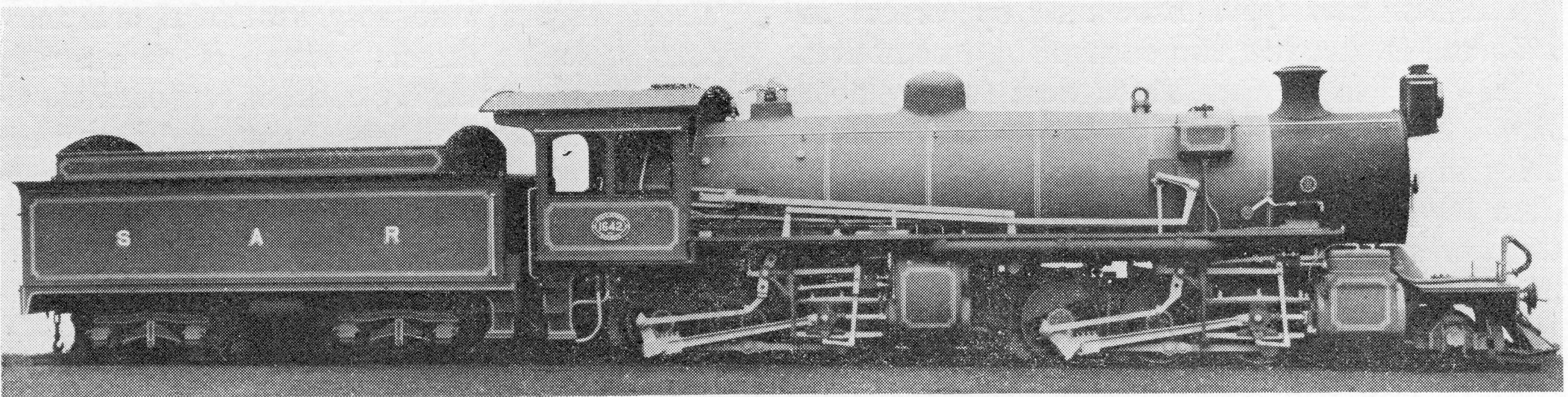
Class MC1

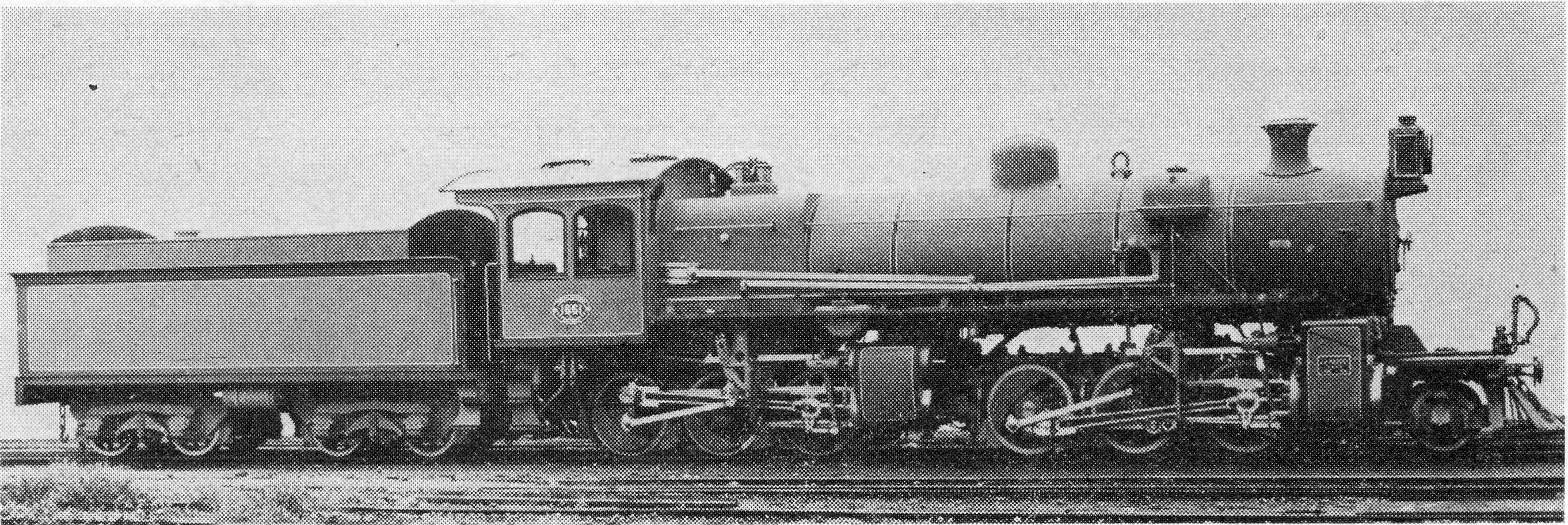
Class MJ

=== Railway lines opened ===
- 1 January – Cape – Kleipan to Birdfield, 6 miles 59 chains (10.8 kilometres).
- 5 January – Natal – Winterton to Bergville, 18 miles 27 chains (29.5 kilometres).
- 2 February – Natal – Ixopo to Madonela (Narrow gauge), 17 miles 27 chains (27.9 kilometres).
- 23 February – Natal – Ahrens to Kranskop, 12 miles 26 chains (19.8 kilometres).
- 4 March – Free State – Marsala to Frankfort, 17 miles 39 chains (28.1 kilometres).
- 3 April – Cape – Gamtoos to Patensie (Narrow gauge), 18 miles 79 chains (30.6 kilometres).
- 6 April – Cape – Caledon to Klipdale, 43 miles 9 chains (69.4 kilometres).
- 5 May – Transvaal – Lilliput to Messina, 19 miles 7 chains (30.7 kilometres).
- 18 May – Transvaal – Sabie to Graskop, 21 miles 75 chains (35.3 kilometres).
- 25 May – Transvaal – Cranbourne to Modderbee, 6 miles 79 chains (11.2 kilometres).
- September – Natal – Newleigh to Estcourt deviation, 26 miles 4 chains (41.9 kilometres).
- 21 December – Transvaal – Bethal to Morgenzon, 27 miles 10 chains (43.7 kilometres).

=== Locomotives ===
Six new Cape gauge locomotive types enter service on the South African Railways (SAR):

- Forty-one Class 14A 4-8-2 Mountain type steam locomotives.
- Ten Class 15 4-8-2 Mountain type locomotives.
- The first of 119 Class 15A 4-8-2 Mountain type locomotives.
- Twelve Class 16 4-6-2 Pacific type passenger steam locomotives.
- Fifteen Class MC1 2-6-6-0 Mallet articulated compound steam locomotives.
- Only two of the ten Class MJ 2-6-6-0 Mallet compound locomotives ordered from German manufacturer Maffei before the outbreak of World War I disrupts further delivery.
