= 1916 in South Africa =

- Decades: 1890s; 1900s; 1910s; 1920s; 1930s
- See also: List of years in South Africa

The following lists events that happened during 1916 in South Africa.

== Incumbents ==
- Monarch: King George V.
- Governor-General and High Commissioner for Southern Africa: The Viscount Buxton.
- Prime Minister: Louis Botha.
- Chief Justice: James Rose Innes

== Events ==
February

- 12 – In the Battle of Salaita Hill, South African and other British Empire troops fail to take a German East African defensive position.

July

- 14-16 – During the Battle of Delville Wood, 766 men from the South African Brigade are killed in South Africa's biggest loss in the First World War.

September

- 4 – Dar es Salaam surrenders to British Empire forces.

== Births ==
- 12 January – P.W. Botha, politician, Prime Minister and State President. (d. 2006)
- 15 January – Rachel Alida de Toit, actor who performed under the name Lydia Lindeque. (d. 1997)
- 28 March – Abraham Manie Adelstein, South African-born Chief Medical Statistician of the United Kingdom. (d. 1992)
- 1 July – Thomas Hamilton-Brown, boxer. (d. 1981)
- 18 July – Sid Kiel, doctor and sportsman. (d. 2007)

== Deaths ==
- 5 June – The Earl Kitchener, British military commander during the Second Boer War. (b. 1850)
- 28 November – Martinus Theunis Steyn, last State President of the Orange Free State. (b. 1857)

== Railways ==
=== Railway lines opened ===
- 18 February – Transvaal – Morgenzon to Amersfoort, 27 miles 72 chains (44.9 kilometres).
- 25 May – Natal – Boughton to Cedara deviation, 11 miles 65 chains (19.0 kilometres).
- 5 June – Transvaal – Volksrust to Amersfoort, 50 miles 37 chains (81.2 kilometres).
- 30 June – Free State – Aliwal North (Cape) to Zastron, 55 miles 33 chains (89.2 kilometres).
- 31 July – Free State – Vierfontein to Bothaville, 23 miles 6 chains (37.1 kilometres).
- 18 September – Cape – Idutywa to Umtata, 71 miles 13 chains (114.5 kilometres).
- 2 October – Cape – Williston to Kootjieskolk, 38 miles 57 chains (62.3 kilometres).
- 18 October – Transvaal – Delareyville to Pudimoe (Cape), 79 miles 2 chains (127.2 kilometres).

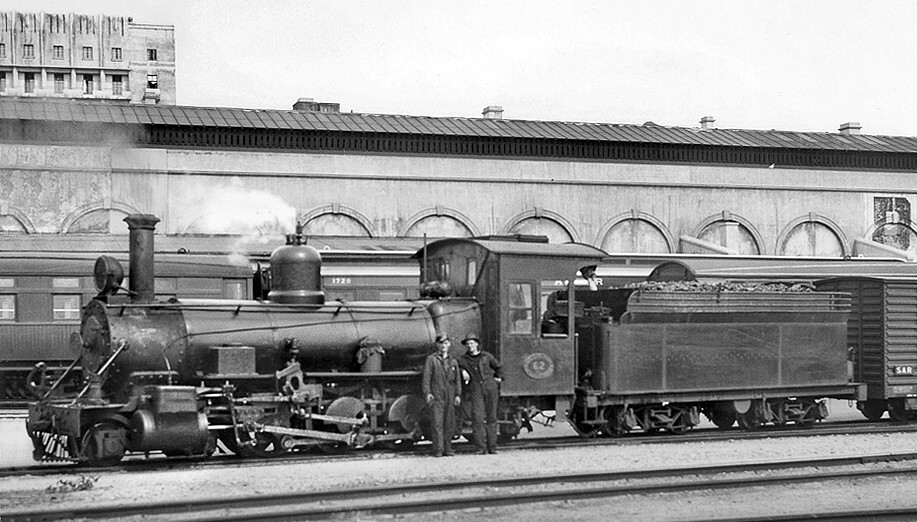
Class NG10

- November – Cape – Ascot to Tygerberg, 1 mile (1.6 kilometres).
- 24 November – Natal – Donnybrook to Underberg, 38 miles 69 chains (62.5 kilometres).

=== Locomotives ===
- The South African Railways places six Class NG10 4-6-2 Pacific type steam locomotives in service on the Langkloof narrow gauge line.
