= 1921 in South Africa =

- Decades: 1900s; 1910s; 1920s; 1930s; 1940s
- See also: List of years in South Africa

The following lists events that happened during 1921 in South Africa.

== Incumbents ==
- Monarch: King George V
- Governor-General and High Commissioner for Southern Africa: Prince Arthur of Connaught
- Prime Minister: Jan Smuts
- Chief Justice: James Rose Innes

== Events ==
May

- 3 – The second census of the Union of South Africa takes place.
- 24 – The Bulhoek Massacre takes place with an estimated 163 killed.

July

- 30 – The Communist Party of South Africa is established.

December

- 28 – White gold miners on the Witwatersrand go on strike in the Rand Rebellion.

Unknown date

- Dagbreek men's residence opens at Stellenbosch University.

== Births ==
- 30 May – Jamie Uys, actor and film director. (d. 1996)
- 21 July – Vusamazulu Credo Mutwa, Zulu sangoma and author (d. 2020)

== Deaths ==
- 10 September – John Tengo Jabavu, editor of South Africa's first newspaper in Xhosa. (b. 1859)

== Railways ==
=== Railway lines opened ===
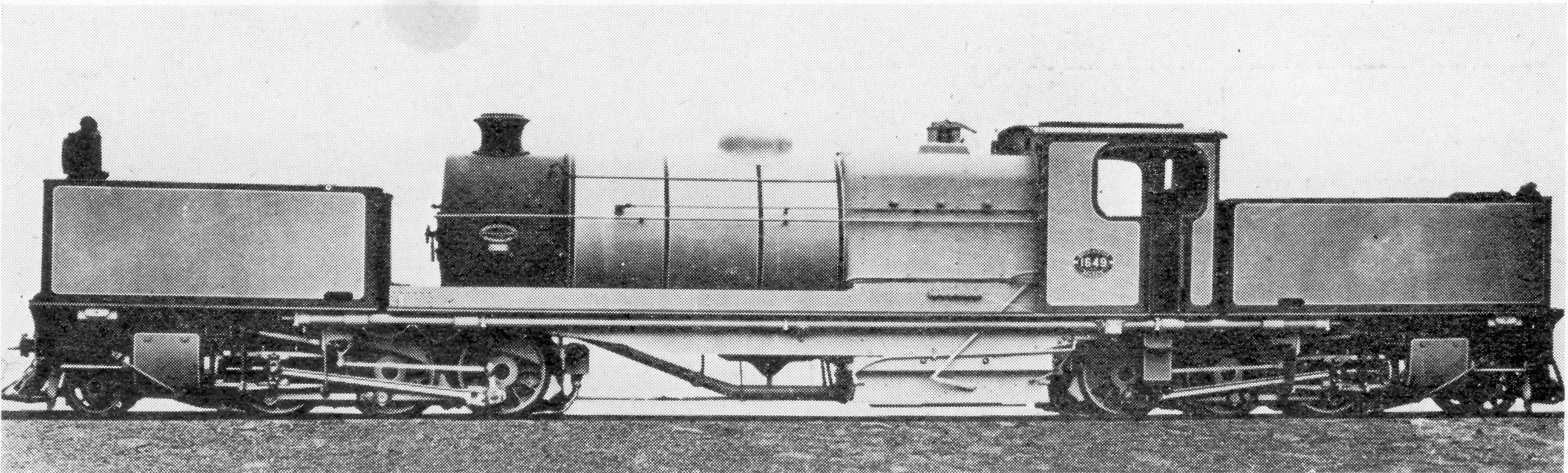
Class GA

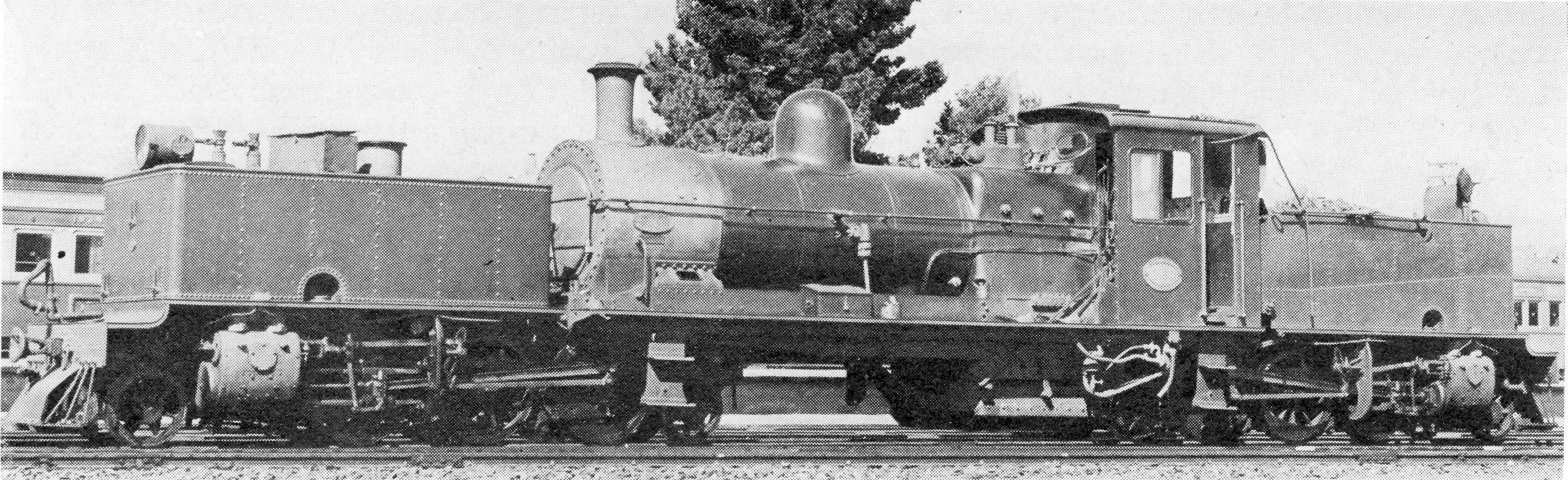
Class GB

- 1 November – Transvaal – Pretoria West to Roberts Heights, 7 miles 38 chains (12.0 kilometres).
- 28 November – Natal – Booth Junction to Cato Ridge, 39 miles 58 chains (63.9 kilometres).

=== Locomotives ===
Two new Cape gauge locomotive types enter service on the South African Railways (SAR):

- February – A single experimental Class GA 2-6-0+0-6-2 Garratt articulated steam locomotive, the first Cape gauge Garratt in South Africa.
- June – The first of seven Class GB 2-6-2+2-6-2 Garratt locomotives.
