= 1919 in South Africa =

- Decades: 1890s; 1900s; 1910s; 1920s; 1930s
- See also: List of years in South Africa

The following lists events that happened during 1919 in South Africa.

== Incumbents ==
- Monarch: King George V.
- Governor-General and High Commissioner for Southern Africa: The Viscount Buxton.
- Prime Minister:
  - Louis Botha (until 27 August).
  - Jan Smuts (from 3 September).
- Chief Justice: James Rose Innes

== Events ==
April

- 23 – The Potchefstroom Teachers' College opens.

August

- 27 – Prime Minister Louis Botha dies in office.

September

- 3 – Jan Smuts becomes the 2nd Prime Minister of South Africa.
- 17 – German South West Africa is placed under South African administration.

November

- 7 – Inspired by Cape Town's daily Noon Gun Three Minute Pause, King George V institutes the Two Minute Silence following a suggestion by Sir Percy Fitzpatrick, to be observed annually at the Eleventh Hour of the Eleventh Day of the Eleventh Month.
- 7 – The first Remembrance Day is observed in the British Empire with a two-minute silence at 11:00 hours.

== Births ==
- 1 January – Eustace Fannin, tennis player
- 3 March – Peter Abrahams, South African-born Jamaican novelist and journalist. (d. 2017)
- 8 December – Mary Benson, activist and author. (d. 2000)

== Deaths ==
- 19 March – Jack Hindon, Boer soldier. (b. 1874)
- 27 August – Louis Botha, Boer general, statesman, first Prime Minister. (b. 1862)

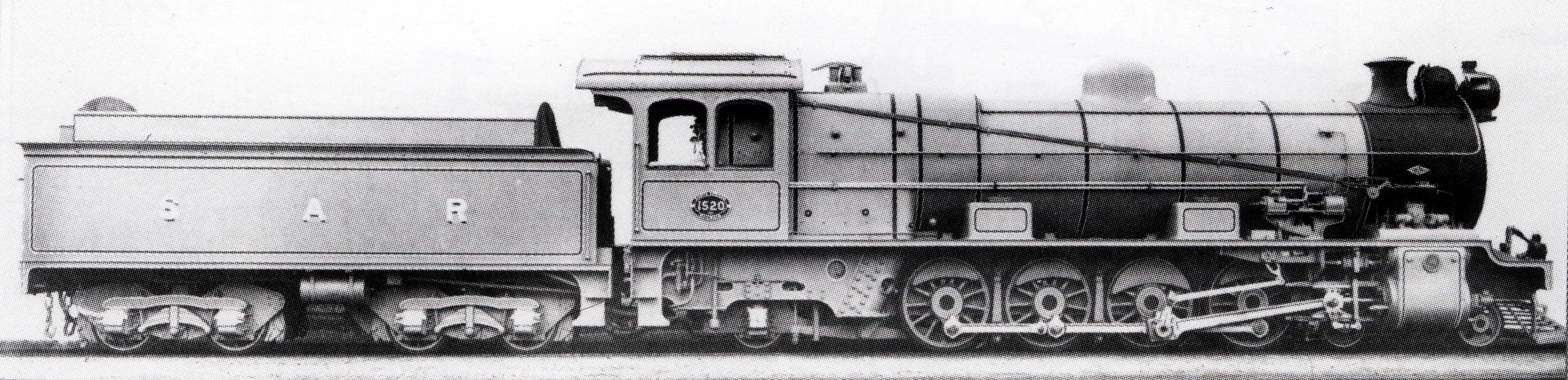
Class 12A

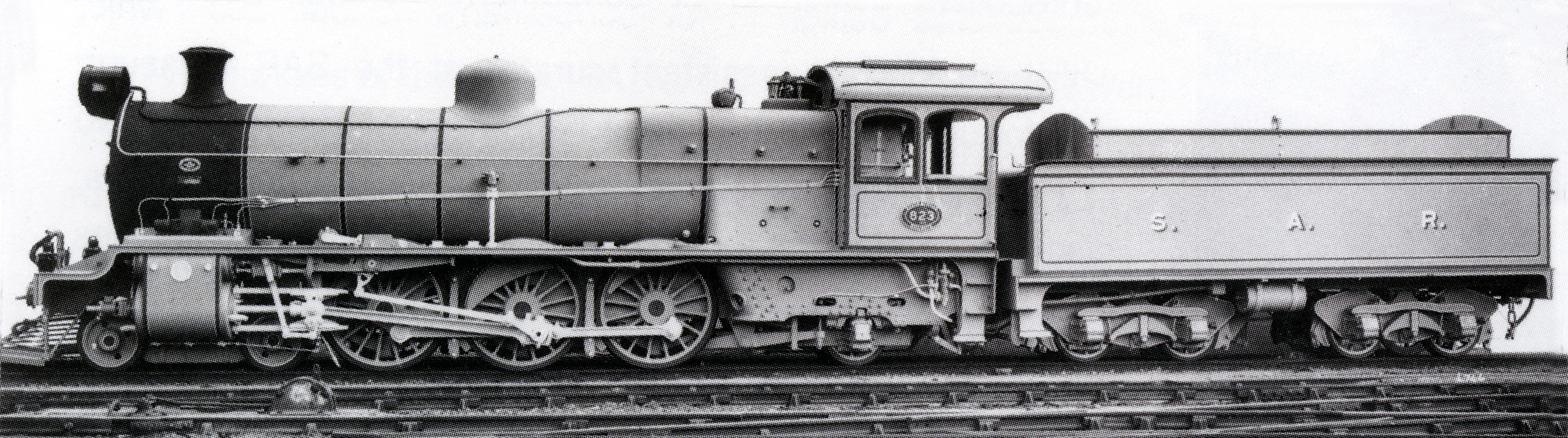
Class 16C

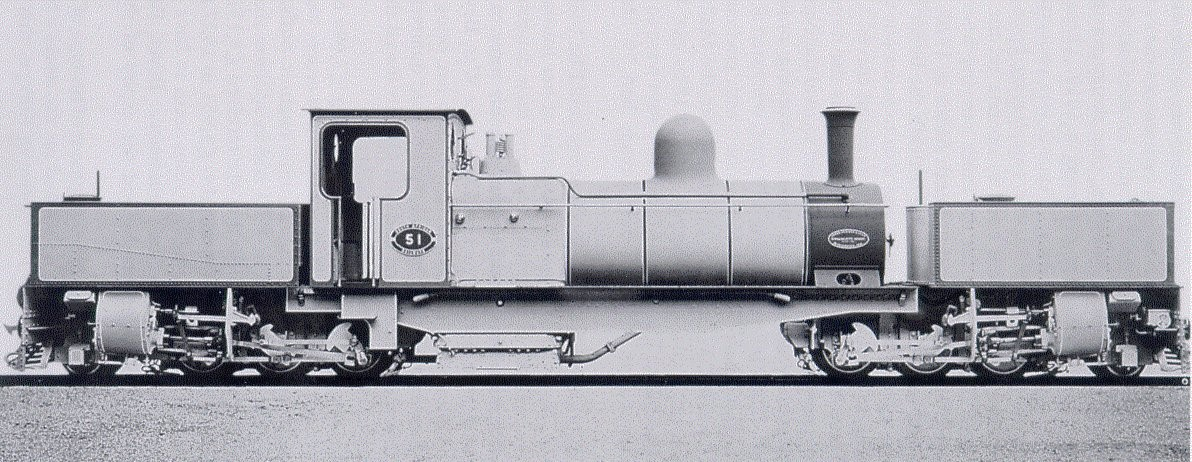
Class NG G11

== Railways ==
=== Railway lines opened ===
- 9 January – Natal – Deviation from Umlaas Road to Pentrich, 19 miles 19 chains (31.0 kilometres).

=== Locomotives ===
Two new Cape gauge and one narrow gauge locomotive types enter service on the South African Railways (SAR):

- The first of sixty-seven Class 12A 4-8-2 Mountain type locomotives.
- The first ten Class 16C 4-6-2 Pacific type passenger steam locomotives.
- Three Class NG G11 2-6-0+0-6-2 Garratt locomotives on the Avontuur narrow gauge line through the Langkloof, the first Garratt locomotives to enter service in South Africa.
