= 1917 in South Africa =

- Decades: 1890s; 1900s; 1910s; 1920s; 1930s
- See also: List of years in South Africa

The following lists events that happened during 1917 in South Africa.

== Incumbents ==
- Monarch: King George V.
- Governor-General and High Commissioner for Southern Africa: The Viscount Buxton.
- Prime Minister: Louis Botha.
- Chief Justice: James Rose Innes

== Events ==
January

- 16 – The SS Mendi, a troopship, sets sail from Cape Town to Le Havre, France, transporting 823 members of the 802nd South African Native Labour Corps.

February

- 21 – The SS Mendi is struck on the starboard side by the SS Darro, an 11,000 ton liner, and sinks with the loss of 646 lives.

September

- The Industrial Workers of Africa, South Africa's first predominantly black trade union, is established in Johannesburg.

Unknown date

- The Castle of Good Hope in Cape Town is handed over to the South African Defence Force.
- Gold mining company Anglo American Corporation is founded by Ernest Oppenheimer.

== Births ==
- 27 October – Oliver Tambo, activist and revolutionary. (d. 1993)
- 20 December – Petrus Hugo, Second World War fighter pilot. (d. 1986)

== Deaths ==
- 18 January – Andrew Murray, author, educationist and pastor. (b. 1828)

== Railways ==
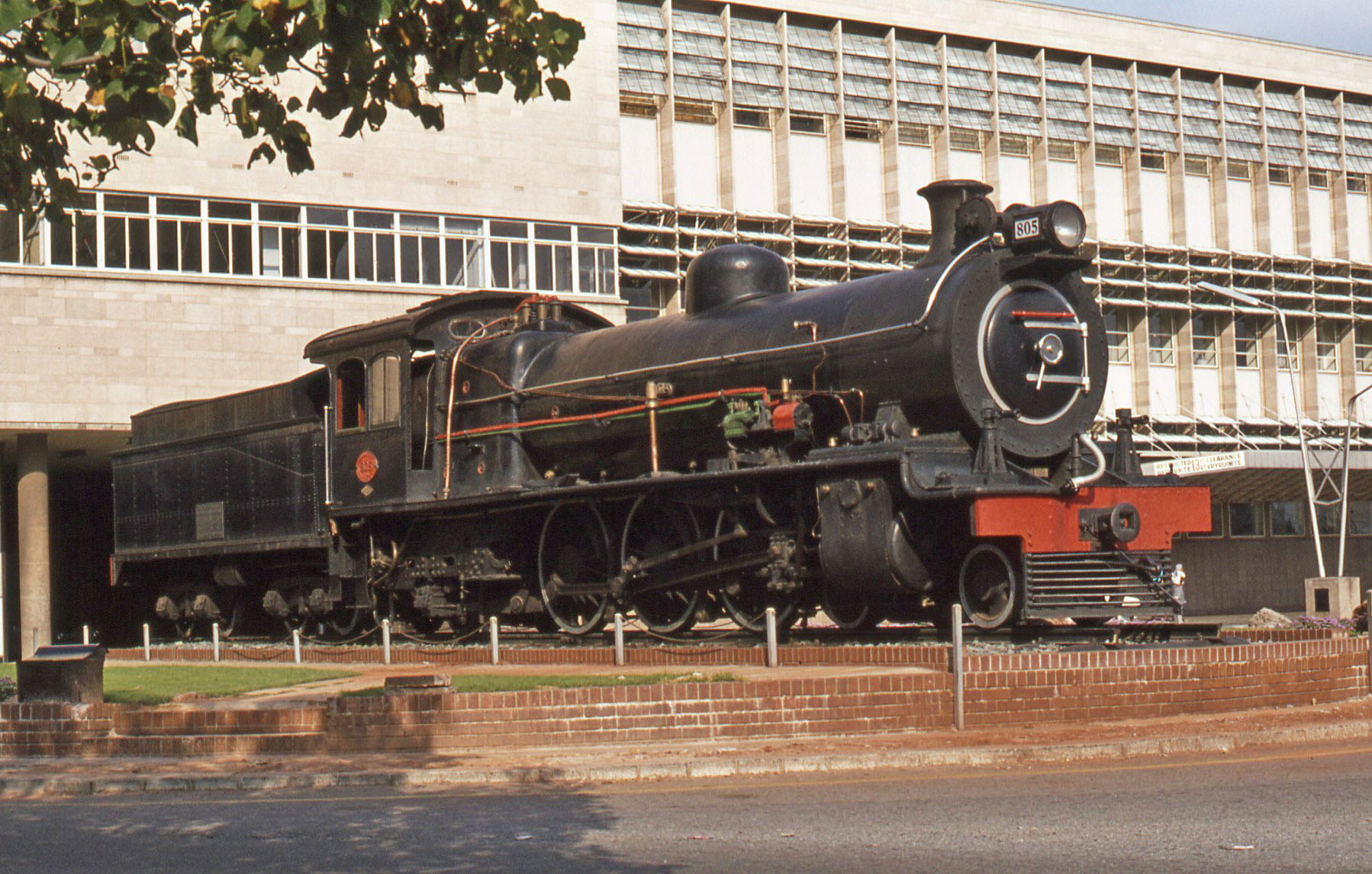
Class 16B

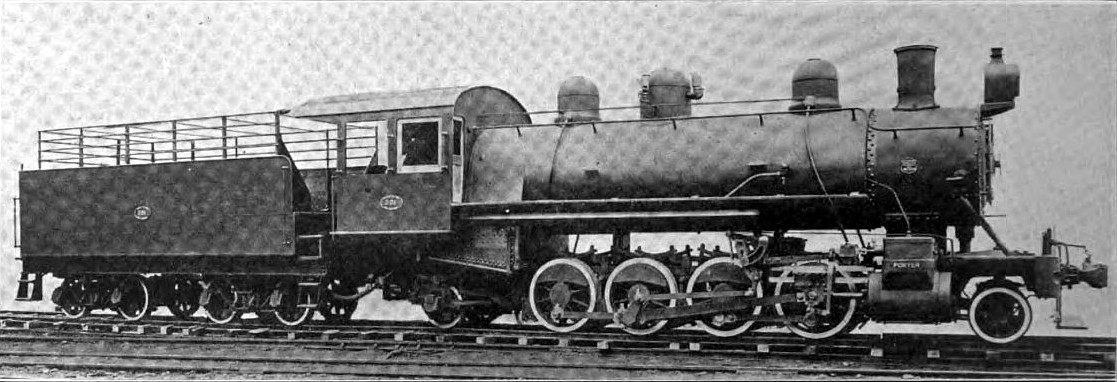
Katanga Mikado

=== Railway lines opened ===
- 5 March – Natal – Izingolweni to Harding (narrow gauge), 39 miles 56 chains (63.9 kilometres).
- 20 June – Natal – Gingindlovu to Eshowe, 20 miles 2 chains (32.2 kilometres).

=== Locomotives ===
- Three new Cape gauge locomotive types enter service on the South African Railways (SAR):
  - November – Ten Class 16B 4-6-2 Pacific type passenger steam locomotives.
  - Seven Class K 4-6-4 tank locomotives that had been built for the Philippines but could not be delivered.
  - At least four 2-8-2 Mikado type steam locomotives, built for the Chemins de Fer du Bas Congo à Katanga and obtained on temporary lease to alleviate the critical wartime shortage of locomotives.
