= 1918 in South Africa =

- Decades: 1890s; 1900s; 1910s; 1920s; 1930s
- See also: List of years in South Africa

The following lists events that happened during 1918 in South Africa.

== Incumbents ==
- Monarch: King George V.
- Governor-General and High Commissioner for Southern Africa: The Viscount Buxton.
- Prime Minister: Louis Botha.
- Chief Justice: James Rose Innes

== Events ==
- An estimated 50 people die in the 1918 flu pandemic in South Africa, the fifth hardest hit country in the world.

January

- 8 – The Koöperatiewe Wijnbouwers Vereniging van Zuid-Afrika (KWV) is founded in Paarl.

April

- 2 – Victoria College becomes the Stellenbosch University.

May

- 14 – The Three Minute Pause, initiated by the daily firing of the Noon Gun on Signal Hill, is instituted by Cape Town Mayor Sir Harry Hands.

June

- 4 – RMS Kenilworth Castle, one of the Union-Castle Line steamships, collides with her escort destroyer HMS Rival while trying to avoid her other escort, the cruiser HMS Kent.
- 5 – The Afrikaner Broederbond, a confidential cultural organisation, is founded in Johannesburg.

November

- 14 – German East African troops are informed of the armistice on 11 November.
- 25 – General Paul von Lettow-Vorbeck, commander of German forces in the German East Africa campaign, signs a ceasefire at Abercorn in Northern Rhodesia.

== Births ==
- 14 January (in Mozambique) – Dimitri Tsafendas, assassin (d. 1999)
- 21 January – Frederick Guy Butler, poet, academic and writer. (d. 2001)
- 1 July – Ahmed Deedat, Sunni Muslim missionary. (d. 2005)
- 13 July – Larry Taylor, actor. (d. 2003)
- 16 July – John (Jack) Frost, Second World War fighter pilot. (d. MIA 1942)
- 18 July – Nelson Mandela, activist and President of South Africa. (d. 2013)
- 27 August – Alina Lekgetha, nurse, chairman of South African Nursing Association and politician. (d. 1992)

== Deaths ==
- 5 December – Schalk Willem Burger, Boer officer, lawyer, politician and statesman. (b. 1852)

== Railways ==
=== Railway lines opened ===
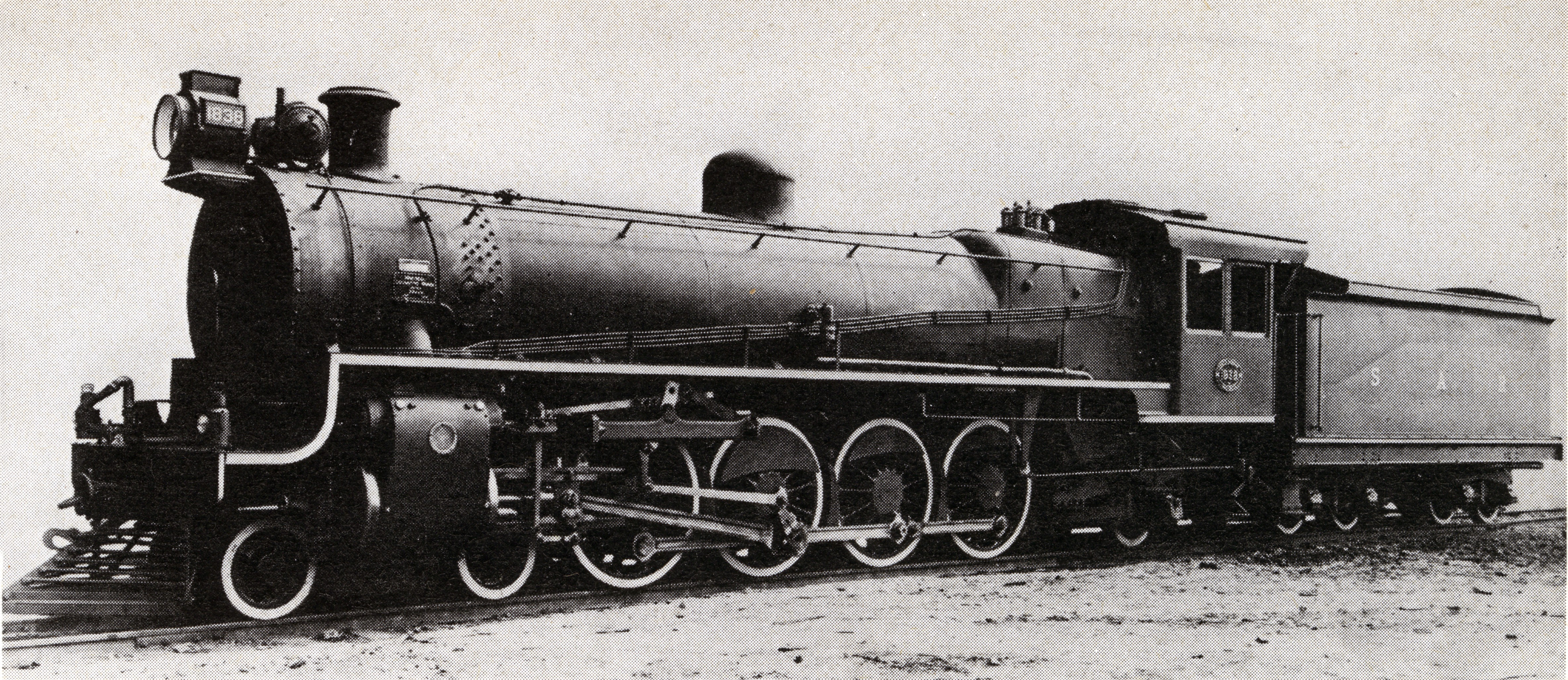
Class 15B

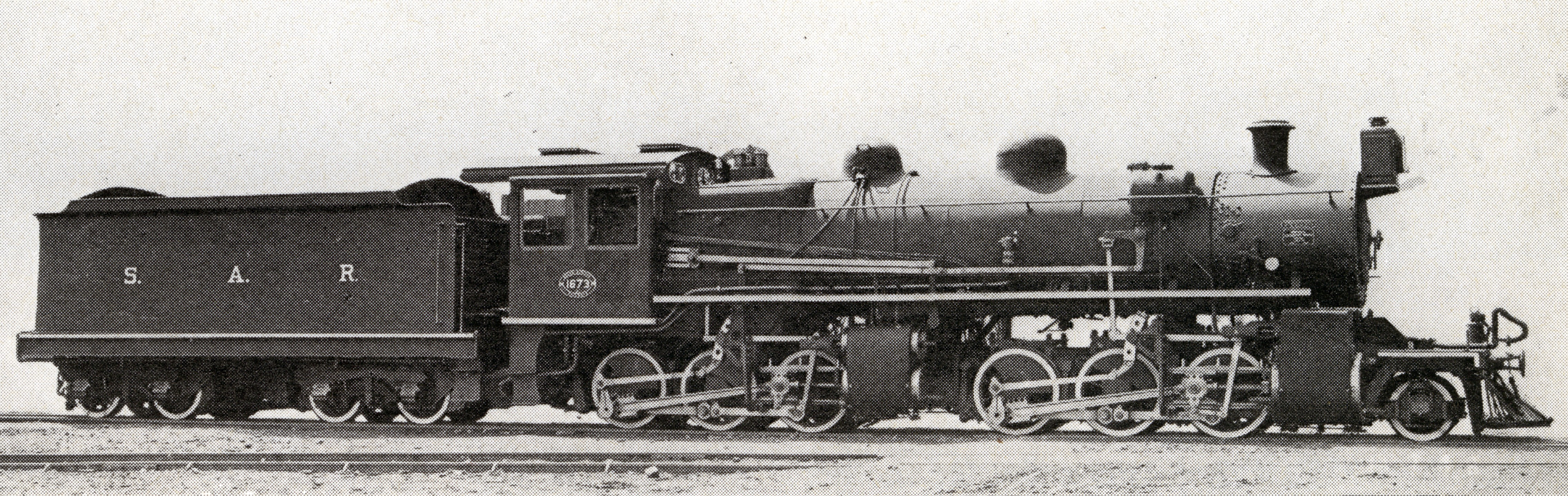
Class MJ1

- 2 February – Cape – Kootjieskolk to Calvinia, 43 miles 47 chains (70.1 kilometres).
- 16 September – Cape – Kootjieskolk to Sakrivier, 27 miles 21 chains (43.9 kilometres).

=== Locomotives ===
- Three new Cape gauge locomotive types enter service on the South African Railways (SAR):
  - The first batch of twenty Class 14C 4-8-2 Mountain type locomotives.
  - The first of thirty Class 15B 4-8-2 Mountain type locomotives.
  - Eight Class MJ1 branchline 2-6-6-0 Mallet articulated compound steam locomotives.
