= Hermanus Loots =

South African politician (1936–2016)

Hermanus Loots OMBS

Member of the National Assembly
- In office May 1994 – June 1999

Personal details
- Born: Hermanus Gabriel Loots; 19 July 1936 Tamboekievlei, Cape Province; Union of South Africa
- Died: 25 January 2016 (aged 79) Johannesburg, Gauteng; South Africa
- Party: African National Congress
- Spouse: Josephine Loots (m. 1984)
- Education: University of the Witwatersrand
- Nicknames: Herman; Manie
- Other name: James Stuart

Hermanus Gabriel Loots (19 July 1936 – 25 January 2016); also known by his nom de guerre James Stuart) was a South African politician, businessman and former anti-apartheid activist. A member of Umkhonto we Sizwe (MK) since 1961, he is best known as the chairperson of MK's Stuart Commission, a 1984 internal inquiry that uncovered and condemned abuses by security personnel in MK camps.

Loots was a member of the ANC National Executive Committee from 1985 to 1990 and later was a member of the party's delegation to the negotiations to end apartheid. He served in the post-apartheid National Assembly from 1994 to 1999 before pursuing a private career in business, including as chairperson of the ANC's investment company, Chancellor House.

== Early life and education ==
Loots was born on 19 July 1936 at Tamboekievlei (also known as Hertzog; later Mhlangeni) on the banks of the Kat River near Port Elizabeth in the former Cape Province. He was the second of seven children born to Gabriel and Minnie Sophia Loots, who were poor farm-workers descended from the so-called Bastards, a group of Cape settlers of mixed European and Khoi heritage.

After matriculating at John Bisseker High School in East London, Loots studied civil engineering at the University of the Witwatersrand, where he became interested in anti-apartheid politics. Among other things, he was an organiser for the South African Congress of Trade Unions. He was still a university student in 1961, when he was recruited into the first cohort, the so-called Luthuli Detachment, of Umkhonto we Sizwe (MK). His family were not aware of his political activities until he announced his intention to leave the country for the African National Congress (ANC).

== African National Congress in exile ==
Because MK and ANC had been banned by the apartheid government, Loots joined them in exile, initially in Tanzania. Between 1964 and 1973, he received several bouts of military training in the Soviet Union, in Odessa, Kishinev, and Moscow. During this period, as an MK cadre, he participated in the Wankie Campaign of 1967, a joint operation with the Zimbabwe People's Revolutionary Army and MK's first major military engagement. His nom de guerre was James Stuart.

Over the next two decades, Loots held several posts in the ANC and MK. The ANC later described him as "an all-rounder" and as "a link between the older and younger generations" in the ANC. He spent time as secretary in the office of ANC President Oliver Tambo and as head of political education in Lusaka, Zambia; in the latter capacity he was involved in training MK recruits and also oversaw the ANC's library and archives.

From 1979 to 1983, Loots was the ANC's chief representative in Madagascar. He returned to Lusaka headquarters in 1983 shortly after a restructuring of the ANC's internal hierarchy, and he was appointed as secretary of the External Coordinating Committee, newly established by the ANC's National Executive Committee (NEC) to coordinate between political and military aspects of ANC actions outside South Africa. The committee was chaired by Alfred Nzo and also included Thabo Mbeki and Johnny Makhathini.

=== Stuart Commission of Inquiry: 1984 ===
In December 1983, a mutiny, known as Mkatashinga, broke out MK's camp at Viana, Angola. Protesting rank-and-file objected primarily to the conduct of Mbokodo, the famously brutal internal security wing of the ANC's Department of National Security and Intelligence (NAT). They also objected to their deployment in the Angolan Civil War and demanded to be sent to South Africa to fight the apartheid state. ANC President Tambo appointed Loots to chair an internal commission of inquiry to investigate the grievances of MK recruits and the cause of the mutinies. Other members of the commission were Aziz Pahad, Sizakele Sigxashe, and Mtu Jwili.

Named the Commission of Inquiry into Recent Developments in the People's Republic of Angola and commonly known as the Stuart Commission (after Loots's nom de guerre), the commission presented its report to the NEC in March 1984. The so-called Stuart Report deviated from the position of the incumbent MK leadership, dismissing NAT's contention that the mutinies had been "an organised act of conspiracy" by "enemy agents". Instead, the report highlighted poor conditions in MK camps, particularly due to overzealous disciplinarians in NAT and encouraged by a lack of clarity in the ANC's internal hierarchy and policies.

The Stuart Report was not made public until 1993, but it won Stuart a reputation as "probably the most important defender of democratic accountability in the leadership of the ANC in exile". Some observers believed that the report saved the lives of mutineers who were awaiting military tribunals and may otherwise have faced summary execution.

=== Kabwe Conference and aftermath: 1985–1990 ===
The recommendations of the Stuart Commission were discussed by the party in 1985 at a consultative conference in Kabwe, Zambia, the party's first broad meeting since the 1969 Morogoro Conference. Several recommendations were adopted, included an overhaul of NAT, and the ANC leadership admitted a certain degree of fault.

Attendees at the Kabwe Conference elected Loots to the 28-member NEC of the ANC, where he served until 1990. In addition, soon after the conference, Loots was appointed to a three-year term as chairperson of the ANC's newly established National People's Tribunal. In line with the Stuart Commission's recommendations, the tribunal was an independent quasi-judicial body that was tasked with recommending sentences in disciplinary cases investigated by NAT. He also continued as secretary of the External Coordinating Committee until it was disbanded in 1990, and in September 1985, he was a member of the ANC's delegation to an early meeting with eminent white South Africans in preparation for negotiations to end apartheid.

== Return to South Africa ==
Loots returned to South Africa in 1991 after the ANC had begun negotiations with the apartheid government. In addition to joining the ANC's delegation to the negotiations, he was a member of the ANC's national elections commission ahead of the historic 1994 general election. He also stood as a candidate himself, and in April 1994 he was elected to represent the ANC in the new multi-racial National Assembly. He served a single term in his seat, serving as a member of the Joint Standing Committee on Defence, and left after the 1999 general election.

After retiring from legislative politics in 1999, Loots pursued business interests. Among other things, he was a founding director of Zonkizizwe Investments, an ANC-linked investment company. He was later appointed non-executive chairperson of the ANC's Chancellor House Holdings.

He also remained active in the mainstream ANC. Perhaps most prominently, he was involved in the ANC's response to the so-called hoax email scandal of 2005–2007, which concerned leaked emails purportedly showing a group of ANC politicians discussing how to discredit former Deputy President Jacob Zuma. The scandal led to the dismissal of National Intelligence Agency head Billy Masetlha. ANC Secretary-General Kgalema Motlanthe commissioned an internal investigation, begun in April 2006 under Loots's leadership and also including Josiah Jele, Gilbert Ramano, and Jackie Sedibe. In March 2007, Loots reported to the NEC that, contrary to the findings of an earlier state-led inquiry, the emails were genuine, though some of the contents of the emails were fabricated. However, the NEC rejected the report due to "procedural flaws".

== Personal life and death ==
During his time in Madagascar, Loots met Nasolo Rasoharinasolo, better known by her MK name, Josephine. Nasolo was educated in France and worked as a translator for the ANC in Madagascar. They married in Zambia in 1984. They did not have any children. Loots spoke Russian, French, and Malagasy, in addition to several South African languages. He was a heavy smoker and died of lung cancer in Johannesburg on 25 January 2016.

President Jacob Zuma declared a special official funeral for Loots, held on 6 February, and the flag was flown at half-mast for five days. Later that year, Zuma awarded Loots the Order of Mendi for Bravery in silver for "his gallant fight against the oppression of the majority of South Africans during the hard times of apartheid injustice. He spoke truth to power without fear or favour."
