= Kabwe Conference, 1985 =

Elective meeting of the African National Congress for the year 1985

1985 Kabwe Conference Second National Consultative Conference of the ANC
- Date: 16–23 June 1985
- Venue: National hall (near Kohima Barracks)
- Location: Kabwe
- Country: Zambia

The 1985 Kabwe Conference, formally known as the Second National Consultative Conference of the African National Congress (ANC), was the conference of the ANC held in Kabwe, Zambia, from 16 to 23 June 1985. This gathering marked the first time in decades that the National Executive Committee of the African National Congress (NEC) was fully elected and transformed into a fully non-racial body.

The Kabwe conference also elected Nelson Mandela as deputy president in absentia while incarcerated on Robben Island as part of maitenaning his symbol. Mandela's written message was read out at the conference and it emphasized his call for unity within the ANC and the broader liberation movement, highlighting that despite physical separation and communication challenges the ANC must emerge stronger and more united - praising the leadership of ANC President Oliver Tambo and South African communist leader Joe Slovo.

== Overview ==
The conference followed the Morogoro Conference of 1969. It was attended by 250 delegates and special invitees from ANC branches, units and student organizations, mainly exiled South African activists from Tanzania, Angola, and Zambia and chaired by Dan Tloome. Oliver Tambo as president delivered the opening address, emphasizing the ongoing violence and repression by the apartheid regime in South Africa, including a recent raid in Botswana by apartheid police and which killed fifteen people, some of whom were ANC members. His speech took several hours to deliver. The conference received various international messages of solidarity from among others Abdou Diouf, Organisation of African Unity, German Democratic Republic, Swedish Social Democratic Party, USSR, British Labour Party, United Nations, Romanian Communist Party, Palestine Liberation Organization, China, Bulgaria, Ethiopia, Ghana, Afghanistan, Australia, American Committee on Africa, Cuba, Italy, Denmark, Sweden and India and it reaffirmed the ANC's commitment to intensify the struggle against apartheid while addressing financial and organisational challenges facing the movement in exile.

It also took several transformative decisions including the introduction of an elected, non-racial NEC — removing all racial restrictions and electing members such as Joe Slovo and Mac Maharaj the first white and Indian NEC members.

Among the key resolutions, the conference adopted new internal judicial and accountability mechanisms to strengthen discipline and justice within the ANC. These included the adoption of a Code of Conduct, the establishment of the Office of Justice, and the creation of the National People’s Tribunal, an independent body mandated to oversee investigations and adjudicate internal offences and grievances. The National People’s Tribunal was chaired by Hermanus Loots, with lawyers Shadrack Pekane and Z.N. Jobodwana as members. It followed procedures similar to South African courts, ensuring accused members had the right to legal representation and fair hearings. The Tribunal could recommend various outcomes, including release, expulsion from the movement, imprisonment at the ANC Rehabilitation Centre, or, in capital cases, the death sentence. All decisions were subject to review by a Review Board and confirmation by the ANC President Oliver Tambo.These measures marked an important step in professionalising internal governance and ensuring accountability.

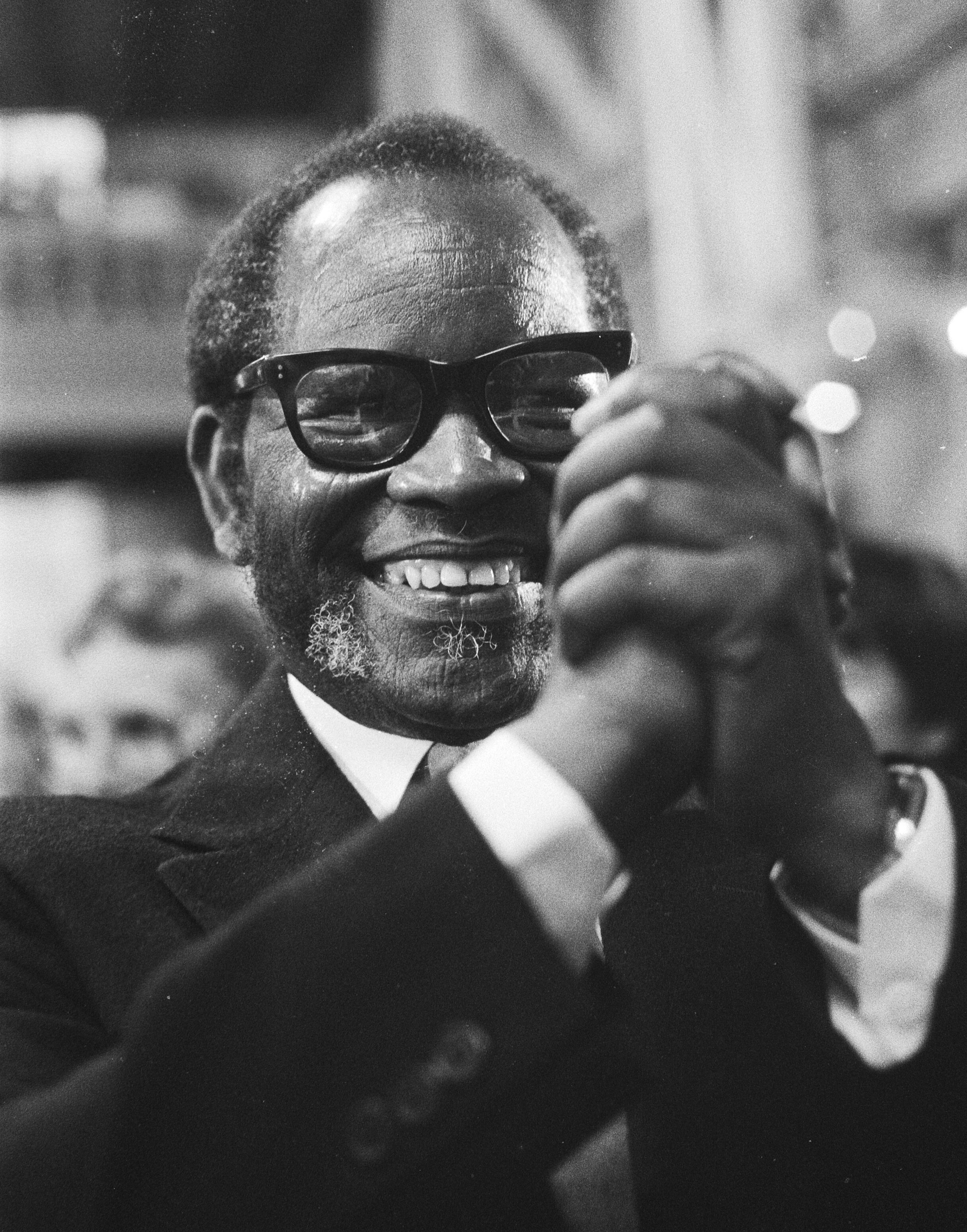
O. R. Tambo, President of the ANC in exile, was known for his conciliatory leadership style.

The conference also endorsed the "people's war" strategy - aimed at intensifying armed and mass struggle inside South Africa in response to growing anti-apartheid uprisings. as well as the formation of a constitutional governance framework think-tank led by Pallo Jordan to begin envisioning a democratic South Africa, which led to the establishment of the ANC's Constitutional Committee in Lusaka in January 1986.

The heavily guarded conference held near the army base Kohima Barracks, with Zambian troops on alert against possible South African commando attacks, the conference urged both the armed seizure of power and a negotiated settlement. Though these seemed contradictory, the ANC viewed them as complementary strategies to end apartheid. Though the conference did not resolve the practicalities of seizing power in South Africa, Tambo’s stirring words convinced members that white rule could be defeated, revitalising the ANC’s drive and political momentum. Internationally, the ANC gained renewed recognition as a potential alternative government. Speaking on Radio Freedom afterwards, Tambo declared that the struggle for a united, democratic, non-racial South Africa was irreversible, urging “mobilisation, organisation and struggle.”

== Criticisms and controversies ==
The 1985 Kabwe Conference, while significant in revitalizing the ANC during exile, faced sharp criticism from some members and observers for its undemocratic practices and internal repression. Critics argued that the conference was dominated by the ANC's security apparatus, known as Mbokodo, which was accused of operating above the law and suppressing dissent harshly within the movement. Concerns were raised that the conference lacked genuine democratic processes, with more appointed officials than elected delegates, many of whom allegedly had no mandate to vote. It was noted that some security personnel and staff voted alongside official delegates, blurring lines between civil servants and representatives. The conference reportedly avoided discussion of key issues, such as divisions within Umkhonto we Sizwe (MK), and failed to address a mutiny that had occurred in 1984 within the ANC's armed wing. Investigations into this mutiny and alleged abuses by the security department were not tabled at the conference. Ethnic tensions within the ANC were also highlighted, with accusations of favoritism towards Xhosa members in leadership positions, contributing to a perception of tribalism. Corruption and moral misconduct within the ANC leadership, including misuse of power for personal gain and exploitation, were other serious concerns expressed by critics. These criticisms reflect ongoing debates about the ANC's internal governance during its years in exile, illustrating tensions between the leadership and ordinary members.
