= Jessie Rose Innes =

South African nurse and suffragist (1860–1943)

Jessie Rose Innes CBE
- Born: Jessie Rose Dods Pringle; 1 November 1860; Bedford, Cape Colony
- Died: 4 June 1943 (aged 82); Cape Town, Cape Province, Union of South Africa
- Resting place: Maitland Cemetery, Cape Town, South Africa
- Education: University of Cape Town
- Occupations: nurse, social campaigner, suffragist
- Movement: Women's Enfranchisement Association of the Union
- Spouse: James Rose Innes (m. 1881)
- Children: Dorothy Rose Innes
- Relatives: Helmuth James von Moltke (grandson)

Lady Jessie Rose Innes CBE (née Dods Pringle, 1 November 1860 – 4 June 1943) was a South African nurse, social campaigner and suffragist of British descent. She married Sir James Rose Innes, who became Chief Justice of South Africa.

== Family ==
Rose Innes was born in 1860 at Glen Lynden and was raised in the Bedford area of the Eastern Cape. Her parents were the Scottish 1820 settler William Dods Pringle and his wife Harriet Pringle née Hockly.

== Education ==
Rose Innes was one of the first women to attend the University of Cape Town after it became a fully co-educational institution, trained as a nurse and during the South African War, and was a member of the Good Hope Red Cross Committee. She was also co-founder and president of the Victoria Nurses Institute and was active in the Pretoria Benevolent Society, Pretoria Women's Cooperative and the Young Men's Christian Association.

== Marriage ==
She married Liberal politician and judge James Rose Innes on 18 October 1881. They had known each other since childhood, when the Rose-Innes family had holidayed at the Pringle family farm. They had one daughter, Dorothy Rose Innes, who was born in 1884, married the German field marshal Count Helmuth von Moltke of Kreisau 1905, and was active in the Christian Science movement.

== Activism ==
Rose Innes was also a close friend of the writer, suffragist and activist Olive Schreiner and they exchanged letters throughout their lives.

Rose-Innes became active in campaigning for women's suffrage in South Africa and was a member of the Women's Enfranchisement League. In 1914 she was elected chair of the Cape Town branch of the National Council for Women. The suffrage campaign in South Africa was complex and was shaped by race, class and the nation's struggle against apartheid. White South African women were eager to get the vote, and some were willing to conform to South Africa's segregation policies to do so. Rose Innes acknowledged the potential race qualification of women's enfranchisement in 1926, saying that "we know in our hearts we shall not get all that we ask, but we are very anxious for that half loaf. The other may come." The Women's Enfranchisement Act, 1930 granted the vote to white women only. e

In 1918, Rose Innes was appointed Commander of the British Empire (CBE).

== Death ==
Rose Innes died in 1943. She was buried in the Maitland Cemetery, Cape Town.
