= Devil's Bellows =

Coordinates: 32°24′58.7″S 26°40′00.1″E

Devil's Bellows Pass (Afrikaans: Devil's Bellows Nek) is a mountain pass situated in the Eastern Cape province of South Africa on the regional road R351, between Fort Beaufort and Sada, Eastern Cape. It is named for the wind funnel effect in the pass.
