= Resha =

Resha may refer to:

- Resha, Nepal, a village in Baglung district, Nepal
- Resha Konkar (born 1987), Indian television actress
- Resha (surname)
