= Bolotwa =

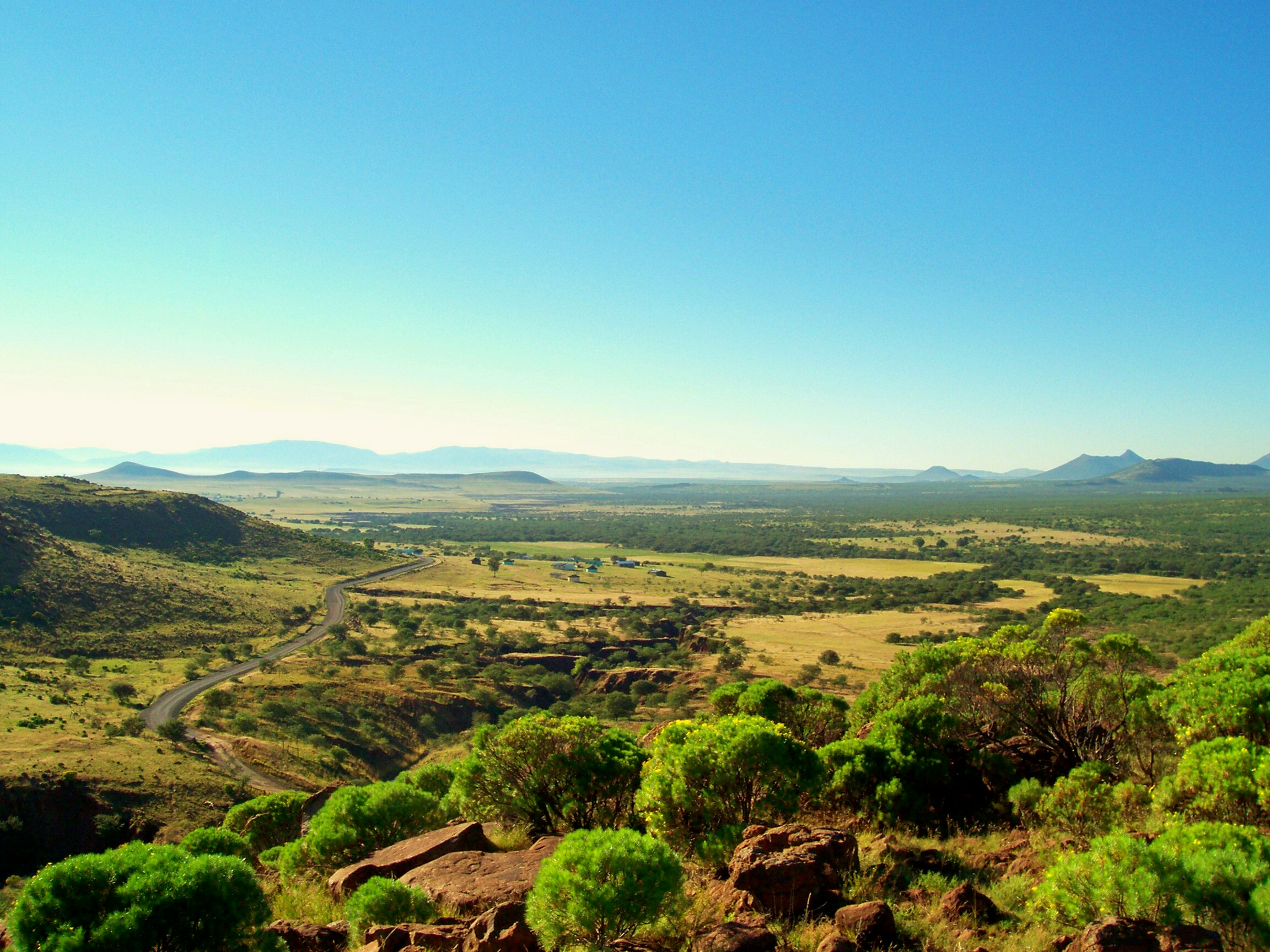
- Landscape near the town of Bolotwa

- Location within Eastern Cape Location within South Africa
- Coordinates: 31.983°S 27.219°E
- Country: South Africa
- Province: Eastern Cape
- District: Chris Hani
- Municipality: Intsika Yethu

Area
  - Total: 4.72 km^{2} (1.82 sq mi)

Population (2011)
  - Total: 610
  - Density: 130/km^{2} (330/sq mi)

Racial makeup (2011)
  - Black African: 100.0%

First languages (2011)
  - Xhosa: 98.5%
  - Other: 1.5%
- Time zone: UTC+2 (SAST)
- PO box: 5325
- Area code: 047

Bolotwa (also spelled Bolotwe, and officially renamed Bholothwa in 2004) is a town in Eastern Cape, South Africa. It is the birthplace of African National Congress leader Robert Resha.
