= Maggie Resha =

South African anti-Apartheid activist (b. 1923, d. 2003)

- Born: Matebello Magdeline Tsiu; 5 May 1923; Matatiele, Eastern Cape
- Died: September 2003 (aged 80); Ramohlakoana location, Eastern Cape
- Education: Hospital certificate in nursing
- Occupations: nurse, Political Activist
- Known for: Political activism
- Political party: African National Congress
- Board member of: Federation of South African Women
- Spouse: Robert Resha
- Children: Nosipho Malie-Resha
- Parent: Tsekiso Tsiu (father)
- Relatives: Caiphus Tsiu (brother), Ruth Molly Mpati Tsiu-Tlhagwane (sister)

Matebello Magdeline Resha, also known as Maggie Resha (May 5, 1923 - September 2003) was a nurse as well as a member of the African National Congress and the African National Congress Women's League. She organized meetings for the adoption of the Freedom Charter in 1955.

== Early life ==
Resha was born in 1923 in Matatiele in the Eastern Cape of South Africa as the second of nine children. ‘Matabello’ is a Sesotho name which means ‘Hope’. Her second name, ‘Magdeline,’ was a name she received during her christening. She was named after her grandfather's eldest brother's wife. Maggie Resha was the daughter of Tsekiso Tsiu and Moselantja Mokhele. Resha's father Tsekiso Tsiu was the son of Moselantja Mokhele. Moselantja Mokhele, Matabello's grandmother, was the daughter of a prestigious farmer in the Eastern Cape and was married to an Anglican missionary. The father of Matabello's grandmother, her great-grandfather, Tsekiso Tsiu, was related to the royal Lesotho family.

Soon after Resha turned one, she was given to her mother's unmarried sister, Maylia, to be raised on her father's farm ‘La Grange’ in Pontseng, which was approximately seven miles from St James. Maylia, a domestic worker, raised Maggie for most of her early life. Later, she moved back with her entire family to a farming community called Klein Jonas.

== Royal lineage ==
At an early age, she learned through stories passed down by her Bafokeng ancestors for generations. She had a direct link with Moshoeshoe I, through her great-great grandfather RaTsiu and his father King Ntsukunyane. Her family believed that RaTsiu had succeeded his father Ntsukunyane as king. However, Ntsukunyane's nephew, Moshoeshoe, had also proved himself worthy of the throne according to various traditional rituals. RaTsiu then decided to overstep his son Tsiu, and gave the position to Moshoeshoe in order to lead the Basotho nation. Nonetheless, RaTsiu remained within the royal family and functioned as the young King Moshoeshoe's counselor. The Basotho people were, from then onwards, led by descendants of Moshoeshoe rather than RaTsui's direct lineage. Resha's great grandfather, Rantsiuoa, only had one daughter named Ntsiuoa, whose two sons became direct heirs. One of these sons, Malitse was Maggie's grandfather. Malitse became the first family member to convert to Christianity. He converted to Christianity while both he and his brother Mosoue worked as diamond miners in Kimberley. Malitse fathered Maggie's father, Tsekiso Tsiu.

== Education ==
Maggie Resha started her schooling at the age of seven in Pontseng. The primary school she attended only had two classrooms shared simultaneously by five different classes. Here, she was taught reading, writing, dictation, basic arithmetic, poetry and music as well as needlework, sewing, weaving traditional mats and baskets. At the age of 10, she returned to her parents to attend the local school, Ramohlakoana Primary School, which was considered superior to the school in Pontseng.

She started to study for her junior certificate in 1939 at the Welsh High School in East London. Maggie was one of the few girls to study the junior certificate during this time, as most girls were made to stay home and do domestic chores. Her parents used to jokingly call it a ‘boys certificate’. She then studied to be a nurse at Holy Cross Hospital. In 1946, she wrote her final exam at the King Edward VIII Hospital in Durban which she successfully passed and received her Hospital Certificate and a First Class pass. She then went to work at the Pretoria Hospital in 1947.

== Political career ==
Resha first found out about the African National Congress in a copy of an African political newspaper ‘Bantu World’ in 1944 during her nursing training in Holy Cross. She joined the ANC in 1948 while she was living in Sophiatown, South Africa. Here, she served as the secretary and chairperson of the African National Congress. She became a member of the national executive committee of the Federation of South African Women in 1954. Then from 1955 to 1959 she worked as an ANC militant during the forced removals of Sophiatown.

By 1959 Sophiatown had become a heap of rubble, and sanitary facilities had diminished to a level beyond human tolerance. Terror of police raids, arrests and homelessness had reached their summit. Then it became our turn. Robert Resha had gone to Pretoria as usual to attend the trial, Treason Trial; I left for work about one hour later. When we returned that evening, we found the children, as well as our household goods on the pavement. The Resettlement Board demolishers had arrived shortly after our departure, and had commenced the demolition of our house without having given us any notice of their intentions.

— Maggie Resha, Mangoana o Tsoara Thipa Ka Bohaleng (My Life in the Struggle, 1991).

She also organized the meetings for the adoption of the Freedom Charter in Kliptown in 1955. During the ‘State of Emergency’ in the 1960s, Maggie was recruited into the ANC's underground cell as she was often questioned by the police. In 1962 the ANC smuggled her and her children to join her husband, Robert, in exile. She stayed in Tanzania for six months in 1960 then they moved to Algeria where her husband opened an ANC office in 1963. During this time the couple printed pamphlets and distributed them in order to gain political support. She also attended international conferences representing the ANC's women's section visiting countries such as Russia and China. She became the deputy representative of the ANC in northern Africa in 1966. Then from 1968 to 1974, she was the ANC representative in the International Pan African Women's secretariat. She also attended several other conferences in order to bring awareness to the political climate in South Africa. These conferences were the Women's International Federation, Organization of African Union as well as Afro-Asian solidarity conferences. She moved to London in 1975 and worked as the deputy chairperson of both the ANC's London branch as well as the ANC's Women's section.

She returned to South Africa in 1999 after her husband died in London. That same year she wrote an autobiography "My Life in the Struggle: Mangoana tsoara thipa ka bohaleng".

She lived in Romohlokana location in the Eastern Cape until she died in September 2003. She is survived by her brother Caiphus Tsiu, her youngest sister Ruth Molly Mpati Tsiu-Tlhagwane, her daughter Nosipho Malie-Resha and her grand children Nomonde, Malie, Mwelisi, S'busiso, Nobubele and Buhle Mkwananzi.

== Honors ==
On April 22, 2008 she was awarded the Order of Luthuli in Silver for “… her excellent contribution to the struggle against the apartheid system in South Africa and fighting gender injustices in society”.

== See also ==
- List of people subject to banning orders under apartheid
- 1956 Women's March
- Defiance Campaign
- Florence Matomela
