= Kohima Barracks =

Zambian Army military installation

- Kabwe District, Central Province; Near Kabwe in Zambia

Site information
- Controlled by: Zambian Army

Location
- Location in Zambia
- Coordinates: 14°24′23″S 28°29′15″E

Kohima Barracks is a Zambian Army base in Kabwe District, Central Province, Zambia. It is located northeast of, and on the outskirts of, the town of Kabwe. It is one of the six major military stations in Zambia. It is the site of the Zambia Military Academy, which trained many of the liberation soldiers of southern africa, including South Africa, Angola, Mozambique, and Zimbabwe.

In 1960 the Kohima Barracks were under construction, and demarcated as a 'protected area'.

== Name ==
It was named after the 1944 Battle of Kohima in which troops of colonial Northern Rhodesia fought. In 1964, that Northern Rhodesia Regiment was renamed the Zambia Regiment and integrated into the new Zambian Defence Force.

== Zambia Military Academy ==
Godfrey Miyanda established the School of Military Training (SMT) at Kohima Barracks in 1970. He was its first head, and later it was renamed as the Zambia Military Academy (ZMA).

There was a bit of a scandal in 2015 when members of the Patriotic Front party conspired to make their relatives army officers through back channels, skipping the Zambia Military Academy. It was brought to light and collapsed.

In 2017 the Zambian Army was subject to review which found they were inadequately funded and that the facilities at the Kohima Barracks not been updated in many cases since the 1970s. The Zambia Military Academy was referenced as the Military Training Establishment of Zambia (MILTEZ).

there were plans to turn the Military Training Establishment of Zambia (MILTEZ), into a military university. However, most of the infrastructure such as sleeping quarters, kitchen, library and dining area, training circuit, parade square and equipment was generally run down due to lack of maintenance. As a result of fallen standards, the Institution, which for many years trained officer cadets from around the SADC region could no longer do so
