= Robert Resha =

South African journalist and political dissident

- Born: 9 March 1920; Bolotwe
- Died: 7 December 1973 (aged 53); London
- Occupation: Journalist
- Political party: African National Congress

Robert Resha (9 March 1920 – 7 December 1973) was a South African journalist and political dissident. He served in the African National Congress as a member of the Youth League and the National Executive Committee.

== Early life ==
Robert Resha was born in Bolotwe in 1920. He completed eight years of school and then went to work as a miner.

== Journalism ==
After acquiring a reputation for being a troublemaker, he took up freelance journalism, writing for various progressive newspapers. He moved to Johannesburg in 1940.

== African National Congress ==
Resha joined the African National Congress in 1939, as an active member of the Youth League. He was jailed for participating in the 1952 Defiance Campaign, along with his wife Maggie Resha. For these contributions, he was accepted into the National Executive Committee in December 1952, serving as acting President in 1954-55 after a ban was placed on the former President Joe Matthews.

Resha was involved in many ANC-directed protests and strikes, including the Sophiatown Anti-Removal Campaign and the Colonial Youth Day Rally.

== 1956 Treason Trial ==
Resha was one of the accused in the 1956 Treason Trial, charged for high treason. His case was the most serious, since he had called for the "murder" of whites in a speech to the ANC National Executive. He was acquitted in March 1961. During the trial, he launched a boycott in 1959. Afterwards, he was banned from attending any ANC events and restricted to Johannesburg.

== In exile ==
After the Treason Trial, Resha left South Africa in order to serve as an ANC ambassador, serving mainly in Algiers. He spoke as a representative of the ANC before the United Nations several times. In 1974, Resha died in exile in London.

== Quotes ==
Africa is for the Africans and the rest is for the guests. We must organise ourselves into a mighty nation. Let us write and work in this second half of the century and stop crying for the whiteman. Whites talk about white civilisation; we have a black civilisation too. We are fighting against nobody but simply stretching a point for what is ours.

The whiteman is busy creating situations of divide and rule and telling one group that they are better than the other in order to make its rule easy over the non-Europeans. The minority of two-million is ruling the vast majority of Non-Europeans, keeping power to itself. These are the symbols of oppression, viz the Lands Act 1913, which deprives the Africans of their land and gave 70% to the whiteman and 30% to the majority of the people. The Colour Bar Act in Industry, Pass Laws and the Suppression of Communism Act all aimed at muzzling the Non-Europeans, and many other colour bar Acts practising racial discrimination, denying Non-Europeans freedom of speech and movement.

== See also ==
- List of people subject to banning orders under apartheid
