= Mhlangeni =

Mhlangeni Hertzog
- Location within Eastern Cape Location within South Africa
- Coordinates: 32.578°S 26.714°E
- Country: South Africa
- Province: Eastern Cape
- District: Amathole
- Municipality: Raymond Mhlaba

Area
  - Total: 1.16 km^{2} (0.45 sq mi)

Population (2011)
  - Total: 323
  - Density: 278/km^{2} (721/sq mi)

Racial makeup (2011)
  - Black African: 100.0%

First languages (2011)
  - Xhosa: 98.1%
  - English: 1.2%
  - Other: 0.6%
- Time zone: UTC+2 (SAST)

Mhlangeni, also known as Hertzog, is a settlement in Amathole District Municipality in the Eastern Cape province of South Africa.

Village in the Kat River Valley, 7 km south-west of Seymour and some 27 km north-east of Fort Beaufort. Originally named Tamboekievlei, then in 1837, named after Willem Frederik Hertzog (1792–1847), Assistant Surveyor-General of the Cape Colony from 1828 and surveyor of the Kat River Settlement. It is now known as Mhlangeni.
