= James Rose Innes =

South African Chief Justice from 1914 to 1927

The Right Honourable James Rose Innes KCMG KC

2nd Chief Justice of South Africa
- In office 1914–1927
- Preceded by: John Henry de Villiers
- Succeeded by: Sir William Henry Solomon

Judge of the Appellate Division
- In office 1910–1927

Chief Justice of the Transvaal Supreme Court
- In office 1902–1910

Member of the Cape Parliament
- In office 1884–1902
- Constituency: Victoria East; Cape Town

Attorney-General of the Cape Colony
- In office 1900–1902
- Prime Minister: Gordon Sprigg
- Governor: Lord Milner; Walter Hely-Hutchinson
- Preceded by: Richard Solomon
- Succeeded by: Thomas Graham
- In office 1890–1893
- Prime Minister: Cecil Rhodes
- Governor: Henry Brougham Loch
- Preceded by: Thomas Upington
- Succeeded by: W. P. Schreiner

Personal details
- Born: 8 January 1855 Grahamstown, Cape Colony
- Died: 16 January 1942 (aged 87) Kenilworth, Cape Town, Cape Province, Union of South Africa
- Spouse: Jessie Dods Pringle
- Children: Dorothy von Moltke (nee Rose-Innes)
- Education: Templeton High School, Bedford, South Africa; Gill College; Cape University
- Profession: Barrister

Sir James Rose Innes KCMG PC KC (8 January 1855 – 16 January 1942) was the Chief Justice of South Africa from 1914 to 1927 and, in the view of many, its greatest ever judge. Before becoming a judge he was a member of the Cape Parliament, the Cape Colony's Attorney-General, and a prominent critic of Cecil John Rhodes. His grandson was Helmuth James Graf von Moltke, a prominent opponent of the Third Reich.

== Early life ==
Innes was born in Grahamstown in 1855. His father was James Rose Innes, CMG, the Cape Colony's Under-Secretary for Native Affairs, whose own father (also James Rose Innes) had emigrated to the Cape from Scotland in 1822 to establish a school in Uitenhage that eventually became Muir College, the oldest boys' school in South Africa, later becoming the Cape's first Superintendent-General of Education. His mother was Mary Anne Fleischer, sister-in-law to Gordon Sprigg and granddaughter to Robert Hart of Glen Avon, the founder of Somerset East, who had landed at the Cape as a member of the British expeditionary force in 1795. Though always sanguine about maintaining imperial ties, Innes was proud of his deep roots at the Cape and considered himself as much a South African as its Dutch-speaking residents:

"I should call myself an Afrikaner, were it not for the tendency to confine that term to those whose ancestors landed here before the British occupation, and to such newer arrivals as are animated by the 'South African spirit'. I have neither Voortrekker nor Huguenot blood in my veins, and 'the South African spirit', as understood by those who extol it, implies a view on the native question which I cannot share. But I am proud to be a South African, and I claim to stand on the same national footing as if my forebears had landed with Van Riebeeck or followed Piet Retief over the Drakensberg."

Innes did not stay long in Grahamstown: in the year after his birth, his father was made a magistrate in Riversdale. And his father's job caused the family to relocate three more times over the next few years: first to Uitenhage, then to Bedford, and from there to Somerset East. Innes consequently attended a variety of schools, all heavily influenced by his grandfather's Presbyterian and Dutch Reformed educational policies. Much of his schooling was received at Bedford under the Reverend Robert Templeton, who drew to his small village school a remarkable cohort: Innes's contemporaries included his lifelong friend and successor as Chief Justice, Sir William Henry Solomon; his brother, Sir Richard; J. W. Leonard, who likewise became Attorney-General; W. P. Schreiner, the future Prime Minister; and William Danckwerts, noted English lawyer and father of Lord Justice of Appeal Sir Harold. In Somerset East Innes attended Gill College. His fondest childhood memories were of his days on the veld and of holiday trips by ox-wagon to East London and to Lynedoch, the Pringle family farm near Bedford.

When Innes left school he began working to support himself and his tertiary studies. He worked briefly in a bank and, later, the Native Affairs Department in Cape Town in the government of the Cape's first Prime Minister, John Molteno. Innes passed his BA examinations in 1874, the year after the University of the Cape of Good Hope was founded, and obtained his LLB in 1877. In 1878, Innes was admitted to the Cape bar and began legal practice. His practice and reputation grew steadily. He fondly recalled his time riding circuit, which allowed him to return by ox-wagon to the countryside of his childhood.

== Parliamentary career ==
=== Victoria East ===
In 1884, Innes stood for election for Victoria East, a frontier district around Alice. He won a seat in the Cape House of Assembly, partly thanks to support from the region's Xhosa voters, mobilised by his political ally, John Tengo Jabavu. Innes stood for election on an uncompromisingly liberal Native policy:

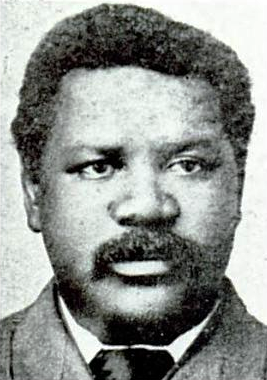
Newspaper editor and activist John Tengo Jabavu, a vital ally to Innes and many other Cape liberals.

"[T]he policy of repression has been tried, and it has failed. What the country requires is that the existing laws should be fairly and equitably administered, and that the Natives should cease to be the subjects of rash experiments in the art of 'vigorous' government."

Innes spent his early years in Parliament resisting the forced removals of Xhosas across the Kei River. Together with John X. Merriman and J. W. Sauer he formed part of a trio of powerful liberal MPs who were prominent actors for the rest of the Cape Parliament's history, usually in opposition.

Though generally remembered as a liberal, during this time Innes proposed a motion to segregate the Cape's prisons. He stressed the "degradation" suffered by a European incarcerated with "the lowest scum of prisoners". As a result of his motion, a Commission of Inquiry was set up and recommended "firstly and most emphatically. . . that there should be a complete segregation of Europeans from Natives, both in gaols and convict stations".

=== In Rhodes's government ===
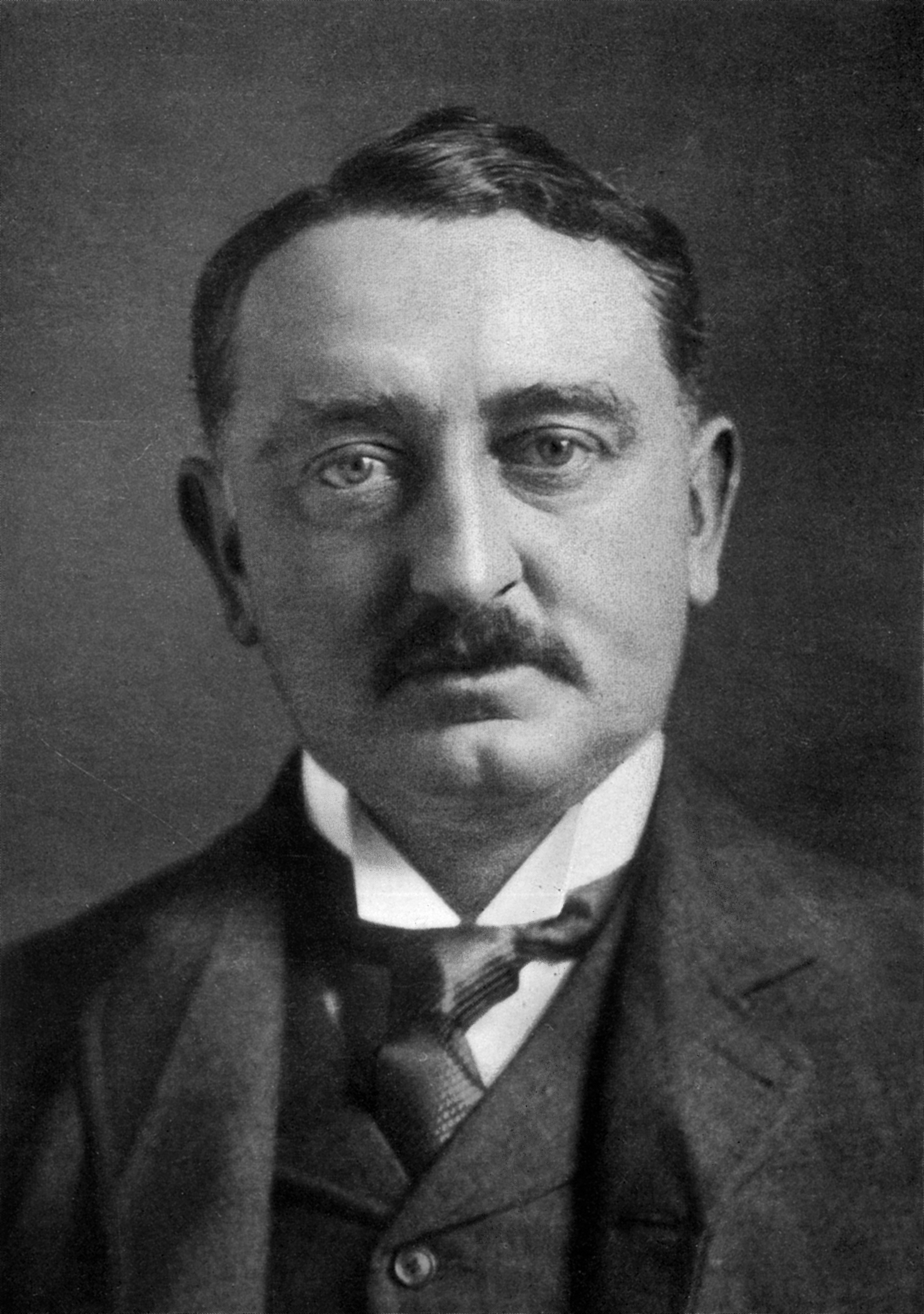
Cecil Rhodes (c. 1900), who "infected Cape public life with a harmful virus" that shaped Innes's parliamentary career.

Innes served as Attorney-General in Cecil Rhodes's government from 1890, but resigned three years later (supported by Merriman and Sauer) in protest. Rhodes's right-hand man James Sivewright had given a lucrative government railway contract to his friend and business associate James Logan without going to tender (or notifying his Cabinet, who found out only when the press scandal broke). Innes refused to work with Sivewright, with the effect that Rhodes had to dissolve his government.

In 1894, Rhodes adopted an increasingly caustic attitude to the Boer colonies, becoming, in Innes's words, "the high priest of opportunism"; he had "decided on a more forceful policy, which led him to exchange the constitutionalism of the statesman for the lawlessness of the revolutionary". The nadir was Rhodes's involvement in the Jameson Raid, an event which, Innes said, "no one ... concerned for the true interests of South Africa can recall without regret". The Raid inflamed racial tension between the English and Afrikaners, and President Kruger's suspicions, and thus led to the Second Boer War. Rhodes's attitude after the Raid had not helped. He had gravely betrayed his allies in the Afrikaner Bond; yet, far from showing remorse, he switched allegiances to their enemies, the Progressive Party, emerging more ambitious and jingoistic than ever before. Summing up Rhodes's legacy, Innes said he had "infected Cape public life with a harmful virus, and to South Africa he brought not peace but a sword."

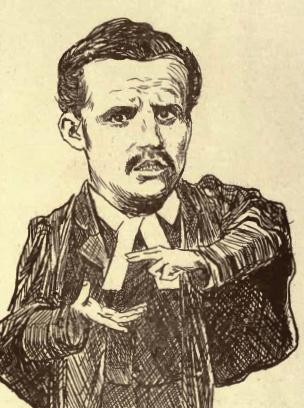
Early caricature of Innes by William Howard Schröder

=== Sprigg's government and the Boer War ===
Innes detested Rhodes, adamantly refused ever again to work for him, and deplored his co-opting and debasement of the Progressive Party. But he never became as estranged from the Progressives and pro-imperialists as many of his Cape liberal allies like W. P. Schreiner, Merriman, Sauer and James and Percy Molteno.

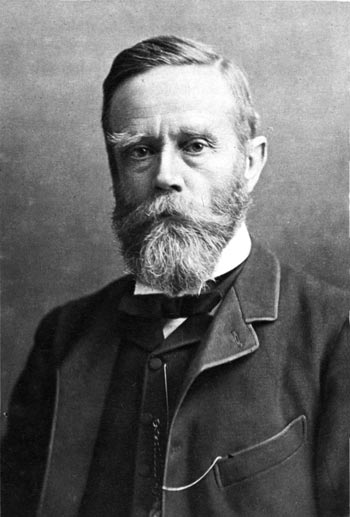
Sir John Gordon Sprigg, four-time Prime Minister, and uncle by marriage to Innes, whom he appointed as his Attorney-General.

Innes encouraged the Cape Colony to fund the British Royal Navy, and, unlike Merriman and Sauer, refused to support the 1898 vote of no-confidence in Sir Gordon Sprigg's government – partly because he had wanted the government's redistribution bill to pass, but also because he felt some loyalty to Sprigg and his supporters, with whom he retained a measure of influence. And Innes never became fully pro-Boer; he was critical of President Kruger's illiberal Uitlander policy and firmly believed, even after the Jameson Raid, that South Africa's best hope was Union within the Empire. When Sprigg was re-elected as Prime Minister in June 1900, succeeding Schreiner, Innes was happy to accept appointment again as Attorney-General, the only non-Progressive in Sprigg's Cabinet.

Innes was gravely concerned about British conduct during the War, and, in determined correspondence with Lord Milner, urged more conciliatory tactics and criticised the unnecessary imposition of martial law (writing to Milner: "I hate the thing. It is abhorrent to me."). But Innes always empathised with both sides, and forever regarded Milner – in the view of many, the period's jingoistic arch-villain – with respect and even admiration.

Innes's movement away from the mainstream of Cape liberalism and into the Progressive government created some distance between him and his former allies. But he remained a lifelong friend and admirer of, especially, Merriman and Schreiner.

== Judicial career ==
Innes was involved in virtually every significant act in Cape political life during his years as a parliamentarian, and his alliance with Merriman and Sauer was a formidable one. Yet he was not particularly well suited to politics; he was too scrupulous and too measured in his views. He turned down the leadership of the opposition, he said, because his tendency to see both sides of a debate would make him a poor leader.

But his skills and reputation as a lawyer had meanwhile grown immensely. He took silk in 1898. As a brilliant lawyer of great integrity, who had won the support of both Afrikaner and English, he was the natural choice for appointment to the bench in the former Boer colonies after the War. He was duly appointed Chief Justice of the Transvaal Colony in 1902 by Lord Milner soon after it came under British control. Innes was sad to leave politics, but never regretted his decision, and described his years on the Transvaal bench as the most rewarding of his professional life. After the Union of South Africa was created in 1910, Innes became a judge of the Appellate Division, and in 1914 was appointed Chief Justice of the Union.

Innes's judgments have had a lasting impact. Because of the timing of his tenures – immediately before and after union – he was able to lay the foundations of the South African common law. He has been praised for defending Roman-Dutch principles against the too-ready invocation of English precedents and ideas. His lucid expositions of legal concepts continue to be regularly cited, a century later, on topics as diverse and fundamental as: the significance of pleadings, the distinction between appeal and review, directors' fiduciary duties, waiver, the grounds for judicial review, determining insolvency, the fair comment defence in defamation law, contractual interpretation, contractual terms contrary to public policy, accession of property, and the appealability of court orders. He is also known for his strong liberal convictions and progressivism.

Innes retired from the bench in 1927. His stated reasons were his fear that his faculties might be slowly declining – though some said he was retiring "at the height of his ability and influence" – and the need, for the sake of his wife's health, to relocate to the coast. But it was suspected he really wanted to give his great lifelong friend and colleague of seventeen years, Sir William Henry Solomon, the opportunity to be Chief Justice.

The five judges of the South African Appellate Division in 1923 (from left): Sir John Gilbert Kotzé, Sir William Henry Solomon, Innes (then Chief Justice), Jacob de Villiers and Sir John Wessels.

== Non-Racial Franchise Association ==
After his retirement from the bench, Innes was free once again to express his political views, and especially his staunch Cape liberal commitments. In 1929, when Prime Minister J. B. M. Hertzog was intensifying plans to strip black Africans of their rights, Innes founded the Non-Racial Franchise Association to protect the beleaguered Cape Qualified Franchise and extend it to the rest of the country. At the Association's opening function he said:

"In a comparatively short time, we shall have to deal with a great body of Natives whose education has enabled them to appreciate the value of the political status denied them, and has stimulated their determination to obtain it, and they will be embittered by the grievances, economic and administrative which are bound to accumulate when one section of the people is deprived of those voting rights which its fellow citizens enjoy.

Is it seriously contemplated, may I ask, to repress these aspirations, to hold this aggrieved and angry multitude down by force? Because – let us make no mistake - it will come to that in the end. This is not a mere denial of liberty; it is a case of taking away liberty which has been long enjoyed. That process, however disguised, is an act of spoliation dependent on force but force is not solvent of human problems. One would think that in South Africa there would be no need to press home that truth. And yet we are apt to forget, in dealing with this problem, that you cannot kill the soul of the people; and that the spirit of man will not tamely submit to the loss of rights which materially and spiritually he values. ...

South Africa stands at the parting of the ways. She may take the path of repression, easy at first with its downward grade, but it leads to the abyss – not in our time, but in the time of our descendants, whose interests it is our sacred duty to guard."

Ultimately, the Association failed in its mission. The government succeeded in stripping black South Africans of the vote, and adopted a policy of apartheid that led to violence, discrimination and repression worse, no doubt, than Innes had foreseen.

== Personal life ==
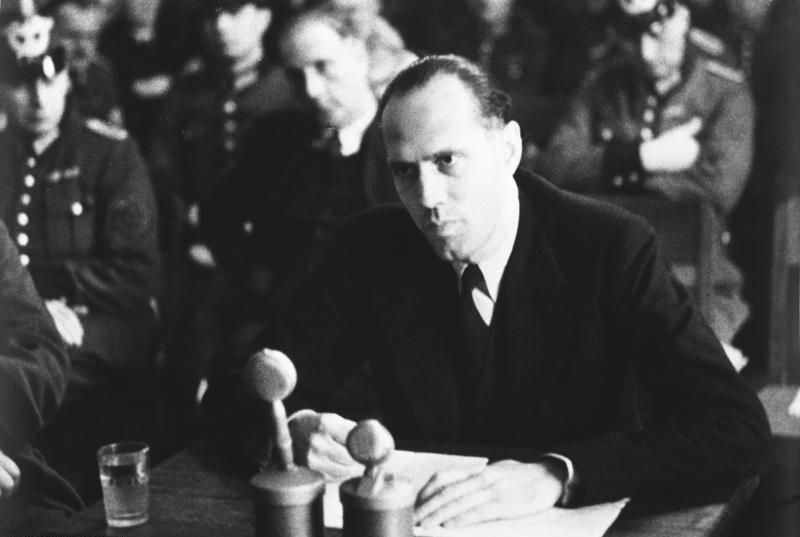
Innes's grandson, Helmuth James Graf von Moltke, before the Volksgerichtshof.

In 1881, Innes married Jessie Dods Pringle, daughter of 1820 settler William Dods Pringle. They had known each other since childhood, when the Inneses had holidayed at the Pringle family farm, Lynedoch, which the pair chose as the site for their wedding. The marriage lasted until Innes's death sixty years later. Pringle, a nurse by training, was active in women's politics in both Pretoria and Cape Town; she was a member of the Women's Enfranchisement League and in 1914 was elected chair of the National Council for Women.

The couple's only child, Dorothy (1884–1935), married Count Helmuth von Moltke (nephew of Generaloberst Helmuth Graf von Moltke, a senior-ranking Prussian military commander, and grand-nephew of Generalfeldmarschall Helmuth Graf von Moltke, the Prussian military commander during the Franco-Prussian War), and moved to Kreisau (then in German Silesia). In Germany she was active in the Christian Science movement. Dorothy's son was Helmuth James Graf von Moltke, a prominent opponent of the Third Reich and leader of the Kreisau Circle. In 1945 he was convicted in Roland Freisler's People's Court of hostility to Nazism and executed.

Innes lived at Kolara house in Kenilworth, Cape Town, which was built by Herbert Baker and is now the private hospital Sandhurst Manor. He died in 1942 at the age of 87.

Legal offices
Preceded by John Henry de Villiers	Chief Justice of South Africa; 1914–1927	Succeeded by Sir William Henry Solomon
