= Hani memorandum =

1969 internal critique of ANC leadership by Chris Hani and revolutionaries

The Hani Memorandum of 1969, also known as the "Memorandum to the National Executive Committee", was a critical document authored by Chris Hani and six fellow Umkhonto we Sizwe (MK) commanders in 1969 in Tanzania. This scathing critique accused the African National Congress (ANC)'s exiled leadership of bureaucracy, nepotism and detachment from the anti-apartheid struggle inside South Africa, triggering the ANC to convene the watershed 1969 Morogoro Conference that restructured the liberation movement.

== Overview ==
Following the banning of the African National Congress (ANC) in 1960 and the unsuccessful Wankie Campaign and Sipolile Campaign (1967–1968), the ANC’s armed wing, MK, faced significant challenges from exile. The Hani Memorandum raised issues of nepotism and security concerns, and other issues included

- Bureaucratic decay and detachment of ANC leadership, that the leadership had become a “machinery” disconnected from the actual situation inside South Africa, failing to communicate or coordinate with branches in the country. It said departments were working in isolation, often focusing on external propaganda with little revolutionary substance.
- ANC cadres were accused of careerism and professionalisation, salaried bureaucrats motivated by money and status than revolutionary dedication, which caused genuine activists demoralized about the struggle in exile against apartheid.
- Leadership vacuum inside South Africa, where many leaders were imprisoned or in exile and which created a leadership gap on the South African ground that opportunists exploited. The memorandum criticized excessive international travel and conference attendance by leadership instead of focusing on homefront struggle.
- ANC-run businesses (like a furniture industry in Lusaka, bone factory in Livingstone, Zambia) distracted MK members from the armed struggle and were sometimes managed by dubious figures, who were now more comfortable making profits in exile than focusing on the struggle to overthrow the apartheid regime in South Africa.
- The memorandum charged that MK operated independently of the ANC, leading to factionalism and arbitrary command structures.
- The memorandum accused the ANC's security department of being ineffective, notorious for suppressing revolutionary cadres internally rather than countering the enemy. There were betrayals, desertions, and corrupt practices within the department, it said.
- It charged that the MK's Zimbabwe military campaign failed because it had no proper evaluation or tactical learning, and returning veterans were not properly welcomed or integrated, creating the impression that they were on their own than for the ANC.
- The memorandum condemned secretive, harsh punishments like prolonged water torture and secret executions of alleged traitors, criticizing these as inhumane and damaging to the revolutionary cause.
- Leadership received prompt and superior medical care compared to rank-and-file members, undermining equality within the movement.
- The memorandum stressed that MK youth were the most revolutionary but were sidelined from decision-making and leadership opportunities. Leadership favoured sending the children of leaders to expensive European universities, grooming them for future leadership while neglecting frontline cadres.
- The memorandum called for preventing “fossilization” of leadership through continuous renewal and genuine democratic processes, rather than monopolizing posts.
- Demand for clear definition of ANC-ZAPU alliance and genuine efforts to intensify the armed struggle inside South Africa

It urged open dialogue between leadership and MK to resolve these issues and reinvigorate the struggle while also expressing concern over systemic privilege and leadership detachment from frontline realities, naming individuals whose roles and privileges symbolized these issues:

- Thabo Mbeki, son of imprisoned Rivonia trialist Govan Mbeki, was criticized for receiving a National Union of South African Students (NUSAS) scholarship to study in London and for leading the ANC Youth Section despite lacking direct combat experience.
- Joseph Kotane (struggle name Joseph Cotton), son of prominent communist leader Moses Kotane, was implicated in alleged security lapses that jeopardized the movement. The memorandum said he was “openly flirting with the Peace Corps,” which was seen as a CIA front involved in spying against the movement. He worked with radio transmissions that were supposed to be secret but had become known to enemy forces. Because of this, many MK members were arrested. The memorandum called this a betrayal of comrades. His family connection to Moses Kotane was also mentioned as an example of nepotism, suggesting he might have been protected from punishment. These issues showed problems with security and leadership in the ANC and MK at the time.
- Shadrack Tladi, nephew of MK Commander Edwin Thabo Mofutsanyana, faced similar accusations related to security concerns involving the CIA and the leaking of information that led to arrest of comrades by the apartheid government.

The memorandum also condemned a broader trend of nepotism and privilege, noting:

“The sending of virtually all the sons of the leaders to universities in Europe... They will come home when everything has been made secure.”

This critique foreshadowed figures such as Dali Tambo, son of ANC president Oliver Tambo, who studied abroad under similar circumstances. The 10-page document also slammed the misusing of international solidarity funds for personal comfort and the tribalist favouring of Xhosa elites and the racist exclusion of non-Black anti-apartheid fighters.

The document’s exposure of these internal contradictions was very important, and led to the ANC’s 1969 Morogoro Conference which sought to address these organizational weaknesses by restructuring the movement’s leadership, recommitting to armed struggle and promoting greater accountability and unity among cadres. The memorandum was signed by seven MK commanders stationed in Tanzania:

- Chris Hani (Political commissar)
- Walter Hempe
- Z. R. Mbengwa (Jeqe)
- Tamana Gobozi (Mikza)
- Leonard Pitso
- G. S. Mose (Mlenze, Transkei province commander)
- Ntabenkosi Fipaza (Mbali)

== Aftermath and impact ==
=== Disciplinary crisis ===
When leaked in December 1969, ANC President Oliver Tambo called the memorandum "subversive". Hani and co-signatories faced court-martial, but MK cadres threatened mutiny in their support and which led to the ANC backtracking and opting to solve the issues instead. The Mogorogoro Conference was convened and became a watershed conference in the struggle of the ANC.

=== Morogoro Conference (April–May 1969) ===
The memorandum forced the ANC's first consultative conference in exile. Key outcomes:

- Adopted the revolutionary Strategy and Tactics document
- Creation of a multiracial Revolutionary Council with Joe Slovo (SACP) and Yusuf Dadoo (Indian Congress).
- Integrated MK commanders into NEC
- Banned commercial enterprises criticized in memorandum

Hani avoided expulsion after admitting "organizational impropriety" but not recanting criticisms.

=== Long-term consequences ===
- Leadership renewal: Younger militants gained influence, with Hani joining the Revolutionary Council by 1972.
- Non-racial policy: Paved way for the Kabwe Conference, 1985 opening membership to all races.
- Inspiration for dissent: Modeled for later critiques like the 1984 Stuart Report.

In 2012, the ANC officially commemorated it in 2012 as "a necessary intervention to save the revolution".
