= Mdolomba =

Mdolomba is a surname. Notable people with the surname include:

- Elijah Mdolomba (fl. 1920s–1930s), anti-apartheid leader and former Secretary-General of the African National Congress (ANC)
- Samkelo Lelethu Mdolomba (born 1988), known professionally as Samthing Soweto, South African singer and songwriter
