= National Conference of the African National Congress =

The National Conference of the African National Congress is a party congress that is held every five years. It elects members to the National Executive Committee, the party's highest decision-making body, as well as the "Top Six" leaders of the National Executive. The next national conference, the ANC's 56th, will be held in December 2027.

== Timetables ==
Before the ANC was banned by the South African government in 1960, it held annual national congresses. After 1960, however, it held only sporadic consultative conferences abroad. In 1991, after it had been unbanned, the ANC held its first national conference in 32 years in Durban. Thereafter conferences were held every three years, until the 1997 conference in Mafikeng resolved to change the ANC constitution such that national conferences would be held only every five years. National General Councils are also held between National Conferences.

== List of venues ==
- 1949: 38th National Conference, held in Bloemfontein
- 1953: 42nd National Conference, held in Queenstown
- 1954: 43rd National Conference, held in Durban
- 1955: 44th National Conference, held in Bloemfontein
- 1957: 45th National Conference, held in Orlando
- 1959: 47th National Conference, held in Durban
- 1969: 1st Consultative Conference, held in Morogoro, Tanzania
- 1985: 2nd Consultative Conference, held in Kabwe, Zambia
- 1990: 3rd Consultative Conference, held in Johannesburg
- 1991: 48th National Conference, held in Durban
- 1994: 49th National Conference, held in Bloemfontein
- 1997: 50th National Conference, held in Mafikeng
- 2002: 51st National Conference, held in Stellenbosch
- 2007: 52nd National Conference, held in Polokwane
- 2012: 53rd National Conference, held in Mangaung
- 2017: 54th National Conference, held in Nasrec
- 2022: 55th National Conference, held in Nasrec

== See also ==
- History of the African National Congress
