= E. J. Khaile =

E.J. Khaile

Secretary-General of the African National Congress
- In office 1927–1930
- Preceded by: T. D. Mweli-Skota
- Succeeded by: Elijah Mdolomba

Personal details
- Political party: ANC

E.J. Khaile was the Secretary-General of the African National Congress from 1927 to 1930. Before this, in the mid-1920s, Khaile was involved with the Cape Town branch of the Communist Party of South Africa.
