= TD Mweli Skota =

Trevor Dundas Mweli Skota (died 1933) worked as a clerk, journalist, ANC secretary-general, court interpreter, and independent businessman.

== Early life ==
His family is originally from the Eastern Cape and his father, Boyce Skota, was of Hlubi royal descent. In 1866, Boyce who was then in his teens, converted to Christianity. Boyce enrolled at the Wesleyan School at Healdtown, following which he worked as teacher, court interpreter and lay preacher. He married Lydia, a leader of the Wesleyan Women’s League and social worker. T.D Mweli Skota was born in Kimberley in 1890, and attended school there. Unfortunately, no evidence remains of his early education and he did not proceed beyond secondary school.

== Career ==
In 1910 at age of twenty, Skota went to Johannesburg and worked as a clerk at the Crown Mines. His role in the formation of the Native Congress, in 1912, is unclear, but it was later discovered that he helped Pixley ka Isaka Seme in launching the Abantu-Batho newspaper. He worked as sub-editor of the paper before returning to Kimberley in 1913. He was elected President of the Griqualand West and Bechuanaland Native National Congress. He later worked as an interpreter in the Griqualand West division of the Supreme Court for a decade.

In 1922, aged 32, he founded and edited a newspaper, the African Shield, which collapsed in 1924 due to a lack of capital to sustain the venture. In 1923 he returned to Johannesburg to work full-time for Abantu-Batho, eventually becoming editor of the paper. He later became editor of the African Leader newspaper from January 1932 to May 1933, after it was founded in replacement of the then recently defunct Abantu-Batho.

In 1923, he became Acting General Secretary of the South African Native National Congress and in 1925, he was elected as the Secretary General of the ANC. He led numerous delegations to the government, engaging with Jan Smuts and countless senior government officials such as General J. B. M. Hertzog, Pieter Grobler, Tielman Roos and Major Pieter Voltelyn Graham van der Byl. He introduced the proposal of shortening the name of the organisation to its present “African National Congress” and adopted Nkosi Sikelel' iAfrika as the Congress’ anthem. He served in this position until 1927, when he handed over to E. J. Khaile. In 1929, he was re-elected and then along with Josiah Gumede, Selope Thema and Levi Mvabaza, was selected to represent Congress at the Congress’ Paris convention later during that year.

In 1935 and 1936, he served on the Transvaal Executive of the All-African Convention. In 1938 he began collecting materials for a pictorial history of the All-Africa Convention, a project he never completed.

He continued as managing director of the African Leader Press, Ltd. (which operated from printing contracts for handbills, posters, certificates and calendars) working from the old underground offices of the African Leader which were on Commissioner Street (Johannesburg). By 1942, he had lost his printing press. From 1943 until the Board's extinction more than two decades later, he led the fight against removing Pimville from his office as Chairman of the Local Advisory.

== Personal life ==
In 1920, at the age of 30, he married Francis Xiniwe. She was a Lovedale graduate and a teacher at Lyndhurst Road School.

Skota was a member of the Synod of the Church of the Province of South Africa, and later, as the bishop's right-hand layman, he became the only non-European member of the Diocesan Board of Education. Skota moved to Johannesburg in 1923, and settled in Pimville, which was initially known as Klipspruit.

Francis Xiniwe Skota died in 1933. Mweli Skota was remarried, in 1938, to Zilpah Shupinyaneng, who worked as a doctor's receptionist, and was the daughter of an A.M.E. Church minister stationed at Pimville.

He had two sons, both by his second wife, Zilpah. The first son died in 1946. Three years later, a second son, Mjokwani Vulindlela was born and died in 1971. Skota died in 1976 aged 86.

== Original writing ==
African Yearly Register, An Illustrated National Biographical Dictionary (Who's Who) of Black Folks in Africa reissued in altered form in 1932 and in the mid-1960s.

== Honours ==
To his honour, Mothobi Motloatse established Skota Publishers.

== See also ==
- E. J. Khaile
