= Morogoro Conference =

1969 Consultative Conference of the ANC

The Morogoro Conference was a consultative conference held by the South African African National Congress (ANC) in Morogoro, Tanzania, from 25 April to 1 May 1969. The organisation had not held a large-scale meeting of its membership since it was banned by the apartheid government in 1960, and the Morogoro Conference was to become the first of three consultative conferences that the ANC held while in exile.

The conference was attended by over seventy delegates, and included representation for various ANC branches, various units of Umkhonto we Sizwe (MK), and other political and labour organisations opposed to apartheid. It was also well attended by interested parties from other African liberation movements: the conference was opened by George Magombe, the executive secretary of the Liberation Committee of the Organisation of African Unity, and speeches were also made by representatives of the All-African Trade Union Federation, the Tanganyika African National Union, the National Union of Tanganyika Workers, South West Africa People's Organisation, Zimbabwe African People's Union, FRELIMO, and MPLA.

On the internal front, the conference sought to address a growing malaise and malcontent, particularly among the rank-and-file of the ANC and MK. It also passed a motion of confidence in the leadership of Oliver Tambo, who had been acting as the organisation's president without a clear democratic mandate. Tambo closed the conference with the summary: "The order that comes from this conference is: Close Ranks and Intensify the Armed Struggle!"

== Background ==
After the African National Congress (ANC) was banned by the South African government in 1960, it was driven underground in South Africa and sought to establish an external mission elsewhere in Southern Africa, with headquarters initially based in Morogoro, Tanzania and then in Lusaka, Zambia. Oliver Tambo, who was the ANC deputy president and had been instructed to establish the external mission, had become the organisation's de facto leader, as ANC president Albert Luthuli had limited freedom of movement due to a series of government banning orders. When Luthuli died in 1967, Tambo became acting ANC president.

While operating inside South Africa, the ANC had held annual national conferences to select its leadership and take political decisions, but it had not held such a meeting since its banning in 1960. In 1969, Tambo called the Morogoro conference – not strictly a national conference in terms of the ANC's rules, but rather a national "consultative" conference – in response to signs of "crisis" in the organisation, particularly in the ranks of Umkhonto weSizwe (MK), the armed wing shared by the ANC and its close ally the South African Communist Party (SACP). The prime focal point of this crisis was the so-called Hani memorandum of 1969, an open letter drafted by Chris Hani and five other MK cadres, which criticised the "wrong policies and personal failures" of the ANC leadership. All the signatories to the memorandum were suspended, which provoked further outrage among MK members.

== Response to the Hani memorandum ==
Discussion at the conference confronted head-on the apparent malcontent in the ANC and MK ranks. In preparation for the conference, Ben Turok circulated a memorandum which reflected on the theme, "WHAT IS WRONG?", seeking to explain and address what he called "a deepgoing malaise such as we have never known before" in the movement, and concurring with many of the complaints in the Hani memorandum – though a response by Joe Matthews dissented on several points.

In response to the Hani memorandum, the conference decided to reinstate Hani and the other six cadres who had been suspended, and it adopted a new Strategy and Tactics document, drafted by SACP leader Joe Slovo. The document affirmed that the seizure by force of state power in South Africa was a central objective of the struggle, but, acknowledging a position expressed by the Hani memorandum, it clarified the relationship between military and political struggle:

[O]ur movement must reject all manifestations of militarism which separates armed people's struggle from its political context... The primacy of the political leadership is unchallenged and supreme and all revolutionary formations and levels (whether armed or not) are subordinate to this leadership.

== Leadership selection ==
The consultative conference did not nominate and vote on the composition of the ANC National Executive Committee (NEC), as it would have in normal circumstances. However, an address to the conference, Tambo acknowledged ANC members' "loss of confidence in the men who have been leading our struggle from Lusaka" and offered his resignation as acting ANC president. Once he had left the meeting, the conference passed an unopposed vote of confidence in him. He ultimately remained acting president until his appointment as president was formally confirmed at the next consultative conference, held in Kabwe, Zambia in 1985.

The conference resolved to open membership of the ANC to non-blacks, a decision unpopular with some of the ANC's staunch African nationalists. Although the NEC remained open only to black members, the conference also established the powerful and multi-racial Revolutionary Council, on which MK and the SACP were well represented.

== See also ==
- History of the African National Congress
