= 49th National Conference of the African National Congress =

Elective meeting of the African National Conference for the year 1994

- 17–22 December 1994

2,719 party delegates
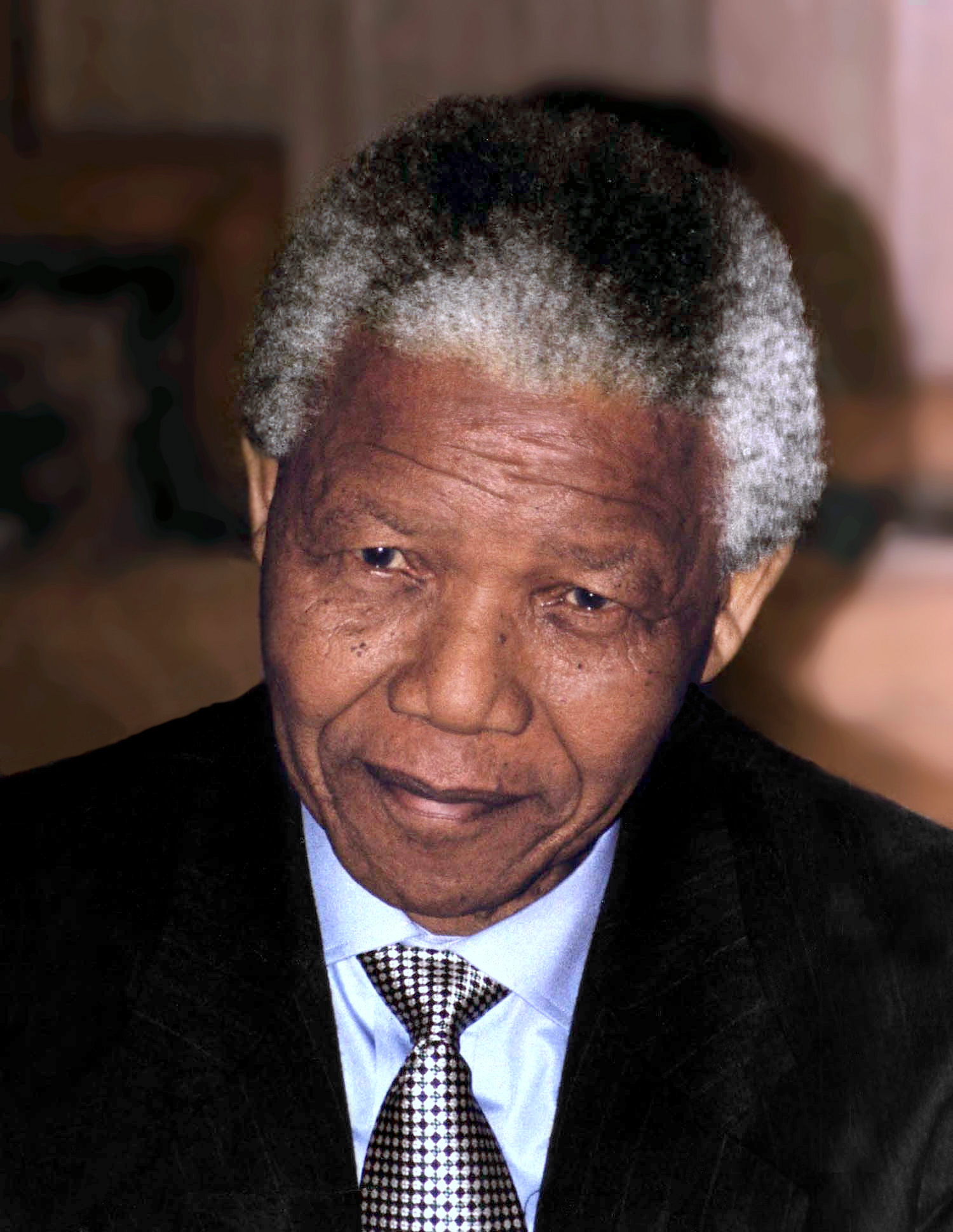
Candidate	Nelson Mandela
Delegate vote	Unopposed
President before election
Nelson Mandela
Elected President
Nelson Mandela

The 49th National Conference of the African National Congress (ANC) was held from 17 to 22 December 1994 in Bloemfontein, the city in which the ANC was founded. The conference took place several months after the South Africa's first democratic elections, at which the ANC had won 62.65% of the national vote and incumbent ANC President Nelson Mandela had been elected national President. It was therefore the ANC's first national conference as a ruling party, and only its second national conference since its unbanning in 1990.

The theme of the conference was "From Resistance to Reconstruction and Nation-Building." Attended by 2,719 voting delegates, it was held at the University of the Free State, which Mandela said was remarkable, given that the university had "condemned [the ANC] as subversive, as treasonable" during apartheid.

The conference preserved the outcomes of the 48th National Conference insofar as Mandela was re-elected unopposed as president and Cyril Ramaphosa was re-elected unopposed as Secretary General (despite rumours of a challenger); however, the composition of the rest of the top leadership changed. Thabo Mbeki, by then national Deputy President and ANC Chairperson, was elected unopposed to replace Walter Sisulu as ANC Deputy President, and parliamentary Chief Whip Arnold Stofile was elected unopposed to replace Thomas Nkobi as Treasurer General. Sisulu, aged 82, had declined to stand for a second term, and Nkobi had died in September. There was contestation around only two positions: National Chairperson and Deputy Secretary General. Jacob Zuma and Cheryl Carolus, respectively, were elected to those positions.

In his opening remarks, Mandela reflected upon the journey the ANC had taken to become "the majority organisation in the first ever democratically-elected government" of South Africa. At the conclusion of his closing remarks, however, he chastised some attendees for their "disgraceful behaviour," referring to them as "men who have been infiltrated into our organisation by the enemy to tarnish our image." Mbeki had delivered similar admonishments the day before.

== Leadership elections ==
The following were elected to the ANC "Top Six" leadership positions at the conference:

- President: Nelson Mandela
- Deputy President: Thabo Mbeki
- Secretary General: Cyril Ramaphosa
- Deputy Secretary General: Cheryl Carolus
- National Chairperson: Jacob Zuma
- Treasurer General: Arnold Stofile

In an electoral contest over the office of National Chairperson, Jacob Zuma, the outgoing Deputy Secretary General, won comfortably against cabinet Ministers Pallo Jordan and Jeff Radebe. The results of the vote were as follows:

Position	Candidate	Votes	%
National Chairperson	Jacob Zuma	1,670	77.60%
National Chairperson	Pallo Jordan	255	11.85%
National Chairperson	Jeff Radebe	227	10.55%

The only other Top Six position to go to a vote was that of Deputy Secretary General. Sankie Mthembi-Nkondo was understood to be Mandela preferred candidate for Deputy Secretary General, and was also supported by Mbeki and Zuma, but lost "decisively" against the more left-wing candidate, Cheryl Carolus. There was also initially a contest for the position of Treasurer General, but Arnold Stofile was elected unopposed after Henry Makgothi and Sam Motsuenyane withdrew their candidacy. The Mail & Guardian reported that Mandela had backed Motsuenyane, and some had viewed Makgothi as the frontrunner.

== National Executive Committee elections ==
For the first time in the history of our country, we have under one roof, sharing the same vision and planning as equals, delegates from every sector of South African society, including those who hold the highest offices in the land. This in itself vividly captures the qualitative change our country has undergone: a dream fulfilled and a pledge redeemed. That pledge, made in this mother-city of the ANC 83 years ago by yet another representative gathering, was to transform South Africa into a non-racial and democratic society. As we meet in the environs where they planted the seed, we can proudly say to the founders: the country is in the hands of the people; the tree of liberty is firmly rooted in the soil of the motherland!

– Nelson Mandela, political report to the 49th Conference

The National Executive Committee was also elected at the conference. Of the 60 members ultimately elected, the following received the most votes:

1. Bantu Holomisa (1,915 votes)
2. Pallo Jordan (1,879 votes)
3. Peter Mokaba (1,824 votes)
4. Mac Maharaj (1,818 votes)
5. Winnie Mandela (1,802 votes)
6. Sydney Mufamadi (1,769 votes)
7. Terror Lekota (1,732 votes)
8. Valli Moosa (1,725 votes)
9. Harry Gwala (1,685 votes)
10. Dullah Omar (1,680 votes)
11. Ronnie Kasrils (1,677 votes)
12. Steve Tshwete (1,663 votes)
13. Joe Slovo (1,651 votes)
14. Tito Mboweni (1,640 votes)
15. Ahmed Kathrada (1,601 votes)
16. Jeff Radebe (1,596 votes)
17. Trevor Manuel (1,594 votes)
18. Nkosazana Zuma (1,557 votes)
19. Kader Asmal (1,503 votes)
20. Carl Niehaus (1,488 votes)

Some anti-apartheid stalwarts dropped off the NEC, either because they did not seek re-election or because they had been appointed to state offices which precluded them from party leadership. These included Andrew Mlangeni, Albertina Sisulu, Albie Sachs and John Nkadimeng. Notably, the top-ranked candidate, Holomisa, was a new addition to the NEC.

== Resolutions ==
The conference passed motions for the urgent transformation of the South African state, with particular attention given to the civil service, judiciary system, media and policing. It also reaffirmed several central party and government policies, including the 1992 Ready to Govern policy, the 1994 Reconstruction and Development Programme, and the Health Plan on national health insurance.

Perhaps the greatest undertaking of the conference was a set of wide-ranging amendments to the ANC constitution, including a substantial restructuring of the organisation to adapt to the post-apartheid era. For example, the fourteen regional branches represented in the party were reconstituted as nine provincial branches, each with their own subregions and branches. The conference resolved to increase the size of the NEC to 66 members (including the Top Six), and also to reduce the size of the National Working Committee to the Top Six and no more than a quarter of the elected NEC members. It also committed in principle to ensuring adequate representation of women in decision-making structures, and resolved to consider gender quotas (which were later implemented).
