= Africa Hinterland =

Anti-apartheid front organization

Africa Hinterland was an overland travel company set up in the UK in the early 1980s to smuggle arms into South Africa for the military struggle against the apartheid system. It was founded by exiled members of the African National Congress and made over 40 trips into South Africa by truck, carrying up to a ton of weapons on each trip hidden in secret compartments welded under the truck seats.

The operation was never exposed at the time, and was revealed several years after the last trip had run. The story was told in the documentary film, "The Secret Safari" made in 2001, directed by Tom Zubrycki and produced by David Max Brown and Sally Browning.

== Background ==
The truck was designed by Rodney Wilkinson, who a few years earlier had planted two limpet mines at the Koeberg nuclear power station in South Africa, just a few weeks before he completed his contract there as the after-building designer. The mines were set to explode just before the facility was loaded with nuclear material, and the damage was significant enough to delay facility completion by 18 months at the expense of R 500 million. Rodney was never suspected. While laying low in London after the bombing, he came up with a design for an overland truck that could carry a cache of hidden weapons under the passenger compartment. The design was passed along to ANC leader, Joe Slovo. Slovo was excited by the design and showed it to Mannie Brown, a businessman and ANC exile, who would go on to set up a travel company and recruit reliable drivers.

The overland truck was based on a stock Bedford truck, and was modified at a farm outside London by Rodney's nephew and shipped to Kenya. The tourists were flown to Mombasa from the UK. For the first few trips the tourists were mainly from Europe and America, but it soon became apparent that the most hardy travelers were from New Zealand and Australia, so the Hinterland team quickly began to target their publicity to areas around Earl's Court in London, where there was a high population of Australians.

The drivers were mainly recruited from the British and Dutch Communist parties and were brave young men and women who knew exactly what they were doing, and were about to adequately look after the paying tourists between Kenya and South Africa. Their duties also included collecting the weapons in Lusaka, Zambia and driving the load safely to a camp site near Johannesburg or Cape Town. The most dangerous part of their journey would begin here when the drivers would unload the steel containers of weapons out from the secret compartments in the truck and into smaller passenger vehicles. These would be driven to drop off areas where unidentified operatives of the ANC would collect and further distribute or strategically bury the weapons.

The South African military knew that weapons were leaking into the country and put spies onto all sorts of transport that was crossing the border. Africa Hinterland was no exception, and came to their special attention because it was one of a handful of tour companies that was openly breaking international travel sanctions to South Africa. The South African Security services sent an experienced Australian special forces operative to London to investigate Africa Hinterland. The anonymous approached Africa Hinterland as a civilian, bought his ticket, and traveled on the second of the Africa Hinterland trips in late 1986 or early 1987. Africa Hinterland driver, Stuart Round, suspected he had a spy among his passengers and reported as much to his handlers in the ANC, but the decision was taken to continue as normal. The cover of the tourists was so complete that the South African spy reported that the Africa Hinterland operation was 'clean' and after this close shave, the trips continued smoothly.

Many of the weapons were used as part of the ANC military campaign against the apartheid regime, but significant caches were dug up and handed over to the new government in 1995. A closely guarded secret within the ranks of the ANC until 2001, is the fact that the Africa Hinterland operation continued to operate after Nelson Mandela's release in February 1990, and for three years after his speech in August 1990 when he announced the cessation of the movement of men and arms into South Africa. It would have been under Mandela's command that the Africa Hinterland operation was ordered to continue and relocate in 1990 from the United Kingdom to South Africa. Africa Hinterland opened an office in Johannesburg and ran trips with South African passengers paying for excursions to the Okavango and returning via Bulawayo, where the truck was loaded up with weapons. These trips took two weeks compared to the six week trips from Kenya, and the trips continued until 1993 when it became clear that elections would be held and the fighting between different factions was dying down.

Very few leaders in the ANC knew about the Africa Hinterland operation and the hidden weapons, but those that did know have said that it gave them some bargaining muscle during the negotiations process. Oliver Tambo and others such as Chris Hani and Mac Maharaj had also been planning Operation Vula, which ran until the early 1990s and aimed to also bring weapons and personnel into South Africa.

== See also ==
- South Africa under Apartheid
