= Operation Nickel =

1967 Rhodesian victory in the Rhodesian Bush War

- Part of the Rhodesian Bush War (or Second Chimurenga)
- Operation Nickel (Zimbabwe)
Date	1 August – 8 September 1967
Location	Victoria Falls, Wankie, Rhodesia
Result	Rhodesian victory

Belligerents
Rhodesia; South Africa	ZIPRA; ANC (Umkhonto we Sizwe)

Commanders and leaders
(Rhodesia) Lt-Col. Jack Caine (Rhodesia) Lt. Charl Viljoen	Dumiso Dabengwa; Lennox Lagu; Chris Hani

Units involved
Rhodesian Army: RLI; 2 Commando; RAR; BSAP; RRAF	Luthuli Detachment

Strength
Unknown; 2 Provost trainers 1 Alouette III; 2 Hawker Hunters	79–90

Casualties and losses
8 killed 14 wounded	In Rhodesia: 29 killed 17 arrested 1 missing In Botswana: 29 arrested (1 later died in custody); In South Africa: 1 arrested Total: 77

Operation Nickel or the Wankie Campaign or the Wankie Battles was a military operation launched by the Rhodesian Security Forces on 1 August 1967 in response to the group of ZIPRA and Umkhonto we Sizwe (MK) fighters crossing the Zambezi River, which marked the Rhodesian-Zambian border. The operation was a success with only one of the cadres out of a force of seventy-nine making it back to Zambia.

== Background ==
The RLI continued to grow in strength during the latter part of 1966 and the beginning of 1967; it first began to experiment with parachutes early during this year, borrowing equipment from the SAS to do so. Walls was replaced as CO on 18 June 1967 by Lieutenant-Colonel Jack Caine, formerly of the British Coldstream Guards.

== Operation ==
The next guerrilla incursion came on 1 August 1967, when a combined force of 79 ZIPRA and South African Umkhonto we Sizwe (MK) fighters (Note: Umkhonto we Sizwe ("Spear of the Nation" in both Xhosa and Zulu) was the military wing of the African National Congress (ANC) of South Africa and was commonly referred to in abbreviation as "MK". A military alliance between MK and ZIPRA guerrillas was announced on 19 August 1967 by ANC Deputy-President Oliver Tambo and James Chikerema, Vice-President of ZAPU.) crossed the Zambezi about 20 kilometres (12 mi) east of Victoria Falls. Having mislaid 10 men along the way, they based up a week later in the Wankie Game Reserve, in the extreme west of the country, near the border with Botswana. The cadres, whose intention was to recruit local black Rhodesians and subsequently attack white farms and police stations, split into two groups. One headed towards Tjolotjo and the other made for Nkai. One of the members who had become lost earlier was captured by the RAR on the road between Victoria Falls and Wankie on 3 August, and from this captive the police and security forces learned of the two groups and of their intentions. Operation Nickel, described by Ron Reid-Daly as one of "the most significant operations of the war," was launched.

At first, the incursion was countered by the RAR, but after a tactical error in its third engagement with the guerrillas led to casualties, the Rhodesian African Rifles were joined by 2 commandos, RLI on 25 August 1967. The insurgents were consistently undone in their incursions by the suspicion of Rhodesia's rural blacks, whose tribal chiefs and headmen would often work together to inform the police and security forces of the infiltrators' presence. This proved to be no exception: when a cadre visited a local kraal early on 31 August to obtain food, an old woman invited him to stay and kept him there while she sent a young girl to alert the security forces.

Seven troops and two commandos arrived at 07:20 and captured the insurgent, who then guided seven troops, led by Lieutenant Charl Viljoen, and a platoon of RAR men to where his five comrades were encamped. The combined force surrounded the guerrillas and opened fire, killing four; the fifth escaped and returned to Zambia.

The next day, on 1 September, two commando troops in ambush were informed by a tractor driver that he had been given money by 14 guerrillas the previous night to buy mielie-meal for them and that they would be collecting it from him at his kraal that evening. A sweep was planned; the tractor driver was briefed and returned to the kraal with the mielie-meal while two commandos and the RAR formed a cordon around it. The following morning the soldiers performed their sweep but failed to find the enemy, who were already gone. The insurgents, who were actually 17 in number and all South African Umkhonto fighters, crossed the border into Botswana and were arrested there on 3 September.

== Aftermath ==
Of the 79 cadres who had crossed the border on 1 August, 29 were killed and 17 captured within Rhodesia, 29 were arrested in Botswana, where one also died, one was arrested in Durban and one escaped back to Zambia. One remained unaccounted for. Nickel was officially closed at 06:00 on 8 September 1967.

Prime Minister Ian Smith attended the RLI's Annual Regimental Sundowner on 1 February 1968, commemorating the founding of the Battalion seven years earlier. Smith stood and proposed a toast to the Regiment and the health of "the incredible Rhodesian Light Infantry". The toast was widely publicized by the Rhodesian press and had such an impact that "The Incredibles" became a second nickname of the RLI alongside "The Saints". Captain F. Sutton, who had three years earlier composed the Battalion's slow march, The Rhodesian Light Infantry, renamed the march The Incredibles.

== Notes and references ==
=== Biography ===
- Binda, Alexandre (May 2008). The Saints: The Rhodesian Light Infantry. Johannesburg: 30° South Publishers. ISBN 978-1-920143-07-7.
- Geldenhuys, Preller (2007). Rhodesian Air Force Operations with Air Strike Log. Durban, South Africa: Just Done Productions Publishing (published 13 July 2007). ISBN 978-1-920169-61-9. Archived from the original on 24 December 2014.
- The South African Democracy Education Trust ("SADET") (November 2005). The Road to Democracy in South Africa, Volume 1, 1960–1970. Cape Town: Struik Publishers. ISBN 978-1-86872-906-7.
- Streak, Brian, ed. (31 October 1980). The Cheetah. Salisbury: The Rhodesian Light Infantry Regimental Association.
- Thomas, Scott (December 1995). The Diplomacy of Liberation: the Foreign Relations of the ANC Since 1960 (First ed.). London: I.B. Tauris. ISBN 1-85043-993-1.
