= Elijah Mdolomba =

Elijah H. Mdolomba was a South African politician and reverend. He was the Secretary-General of the African National Congress from 1930 to 1936.

== Biography ==
Mdolomba was born in the Cape Colony and received his education at Healdtown. He became an ordained reverend.

In the 1920s, Mdolomba served at the helm of the African National Congress in the Cape Colony. He went on to serve as Secretary-General of the ANC, and was succeeded by James Calata.
