= Arthur Kemp =

Rhodesian-born writer and publisher of racist literature

- Born: 1963 (age 62–63); Southern Rhodesia
- Occupation: Publisher
- Known for: Former foreign affairs spokesperson of the British National Party
- Website: www.arthurkemp.com

Arthur Kemp (born in 1963) is a Rhodesian writer and the owner of Ostara Publications, a distributor of racist tracts, who was from 2009 to 2011 the foreign affairs spokesperson for the British National Party. He was born in Southern Rhodesia (now Zimbabwe) and worked as a right-wing journalist in South Africa before moving to the United Kingdom in 1996.

== Biography ==
Kemp was born in 1963 in Southern Rhodesia, and spent his early years in South Africa. His father is British and his mother is Dutch. He attended the University of Cape Town in the early 1980s.

=== Career in South Africa ===
Kemp was conscripted and served as a sergeant in the South African Police in Johannesburg from 1987 to 1988.

From 1989 to 1992, Kemp worked for Die Patriot, the newspaper of the white supremacist South African Conservative Party. Kemp also wrote for The Citizen newspaper, as well as The Patriot, a far-right newspaper. In the early 1990s he worked for the National Intelligence Service, according to British newspapers.

In 1993, Kemp was a key prosecution witness in the trial after the assassination of the South African Communist Party leader Chris Hani. Kemp had been one of the right-wing activists arrested after the murder but was released without charge. Kemp gave evidence against Clive Derby-Lewis and his wife, Gaye Derby-Lewis, saying they admitted their involvement during a lunch the three had together two days after Hani's death. Clive Derby-Lewis and the assassin, Janusz Walus, were found guilty and sentenced to death (both death sentences were later commuted to life imprisonment), while Gaye Derby-Lewis was acquitted. At the trial, Kemp said he had made a list of addresses including Hani's and gave it to Gaye Derby-Lewis, but said he did not know it would be used for a murder. Hani's name was the third name on the list; at the top was Nelson Mandela's.

Kemp has written that he was later expelled from the Conservative Party for publicly opposing apartheid and arguing in favour of Afrikaner separatism.

=== British National Party ===
Kemp moved to the United Kingdom in 1996. That year he spoke at a neo-Nazi meeting in Germany, according to the British anti-racism magazine Searchlight, and he wrote for the German fascist publication Nation und Europa.

In 1999 he began Ostara Publications "as a means of distributing his own white supremacist screeds", according to the Southern Poverty Law Center (SPLC). Later it distributed racist tracts from the 19th and 20th centuries as well as work by Jared Taylor.

He became manager of Excalibur, the British National Party (BNP)'s merchandising arm, until in 2010 he was put in charge of the BNP website.

In 2004, Kemp worked for Nick Griffin, the BNP's leader, in elections for the London Assembly and attended a BNP rally in Bromley.

In 2009, Kemp "was spotted in the BNP's election headquarters in Wales preparing thousands of campaign leaflets", according to The Independent. Searchlight said Kemp, as editor of the BNP website, was in charge of "ideological training of the party's 250 or so elite activists". It said Kemp was likely helping the BNP raise money from wealthy white South Africans, as the largest share of BNP website traffic came from South Africa.

In March 2011, Kemp resigned from all positions in the party including that of web editor, foreign affairs spokesman and Advisory Council member. No official reason was given. SPLC reported that he resigned these roles in order to become editor-in-chief of a British nationalist website owned by Andrew Brons. On 2 September 2011, Kemp announced on his blog that he was no longer a member of the BNP.

As of 2016, he ran a website called The New Observer Online, which campaigned for Brexit and demonized immigrants as "invaders" and "rapefugees". The website was described by the SPLC as "arguably among the most racist websites in the United Kingdom".

=== United States ===
In 2007, Kemp took a senior position in the American neo-Nazi group National Alliance, according to the SPLC. He worked as the National Alliance's media director for several years in the mid-2000s and ghostwrote some of chairman Erich Gliebe's speeches and shortwave broadcasts. Kemp denied a connection with the National Alliance, but the SPLC found wire transfers sent from the group to Kemp's South African bank account.

=== Publications ===
In 1990 in South Africa, Kemp published a book on the Afrikaner Weerstandsbeweging (AWB – Afrikaner Resistance Movement), Victory Or Violence: The Story of the AWB, which he re-published in 2009 as Victory Or Violence: The Story of the AWB of South Africa. This book was subsequently updated and revised in 2012 to include information about the murder of Eugène Terre'Blanche. The SPLC described the book in 2007 as "a glowing history of the white supremacist Afrikaner Resistance Movement".

Kemp has written and self-published several books, including March of the Titans: A History of the White Race, which was described as "clearly neo-Nazi material" by historian Paul Jackson. Alan Waring described it as "a typical product of British neo-Nazism, synthesizing Holocaust denial and spurious claims about white racial superiority. It questions the number of Jews killed in the Holocaust, and according to The Guardian, "is popular with far-right activists around the world". Although Kemp said, "I deny outright that my book denies the Holocaust", the book itself says, "certainly far fewer died than what is most often claimed. Increasingly, all the evidence urges a complete revision of this aspect of the history of World War Two."

The National Alliance, an American neo-Nazi group, awarded him its "Dr. William Pierce Award for Investigative Journalism" (named after the neo-Nazi William Pierce), with a $250 prize, for his article in National Vanguard, "White South Africa: What Went Wrong?". In National Vanguard he wrote using his own name and also a pseudonym, Richard Preston.

== Bibliography ==
- Victory Or Violence - The Story of the AWB of South Africa (1990, republished 2009, 2012) ISBN 978-1471067464
- March of the Titans: a history of the White Race (1999, reprinted and expanded 2000, 2001, 2002, 2004, 2006, 2008, 2009, 2011) ISBN 978-1105328749; reprinted in two volumes in 2013 as March of the Titans: The Complete History of the White Race: Volume I: The Rise of Europe ISBN 978-1480242296; and March of the Titans: The Complete History of the White Race: Volume II: Europe and the World ISBN 978-1490909134.
- Jihad: Islam's 1,300 Year War Against Western Civilisation (2008) ISBN 978-1409205029
- The Immigration Invasion (2008) ISBN 978-1409243632
- The Lie of Apartheid and Other True Stories from Southern Africa (2009) ISBN 978-1409254218
- Four Flags: The Indigenous People of Britain (2010) ISBN 978-1445287751
- Headline: The Best of BNP News: The Stories Which Helped Propel the British National Party into the Political Mainstream. Volume I, July–December 2008 (2011), ISBN 978-1409289203.
- Headline: The Best of BNP News: The Stories Which Helped Propel the British National Party into the Political Mainstream. Volume II, January–June 2009. (2011) ISBN 978-1-4092-8995-1.
- The Children of Ra: Artistic, Historical and Genetic Evidence For Ancient White Egypt (2012) ISBN 978-1471005626
- Folk And Nation Underpinning The Ethnostate (2012) ISBN 978-1447594925, reprinted 2012 as Folk and Nation: Ethnonationalism Explained ISBN 978-1291166163
- Nova Europa: European Survival Strategies in a Darkening World (2013) ISBN 978-1291263602
