= Red Dust =

Red dust or Red Dust may refer to:

== Films ==
- Red Dust (1932 film), an American romantic drama directed by Victor Fleming
- Red Dust (1990 film) (Chinese: 滚滚红尘), a 1990 Hong Kong/Taiwanese film directed by Yim Ho
- Red Dust (1999 film) (Crvena prašina), a 1999 Croatian action film directed by Zrinko Ogresta
- Red Dust (2004 film), a 2004 British/South African drama directed by Tom Hooper

== Novels ==
- Red Dust, a 1993 science fiction novel by Paul J. McAuley
- Red Dust (novel), a 2000 novel by Gillian Slovo
- Red Dust, a 2001 novel by Ma Jian

== Other uses ==
- Red dust, a common name for stem rust of grain crops
- Red Dust, a key fictional device in the V science fiction book, TV and videogame franchise
- "Red Dust", a song by Iron & Wine and Calexico on the album In the Reins
