= Assassination of Chris Hani =

1993 murder in Boksburg, South Africa

- Location: Dawn Park, Boksburg, South Africa
- Date: 10 April 1993
- Target: Chris Hani
- Attack type: Assassination
- Weapon: Z-88 9mm pistol
- Deaths: 1
- Perpetrators: Janusz Waluś; Clive Derby-Lewis
- Motive: Anti-communism; Preservation of apartheid

Chris Hani, General-Secretary of the South African Communist Party (SACP), was assassinated by right-wing extremist Janusz Waluś on 10 April 1993. The assassination, later tied to members within the Conservative Party, occurred outside Hani's home in Dawn Park during a peak period of progressive anti-apartheid momentum in South Africa. After the assassination, racially fuelled riots drew international attention to the instability of the political division within South Africa, leading to an inclusive national democratic election in April 1994, won by the African National Congress (ANC). Waluś and his accomplice Clive Derby-Lewis were both sentenced to death after their arrests in 1993; the sentences were later commuted to life imprisonment.

== Political background ==
Chris Hani joined the ANC (African National Congress) Youth League aged fifteen as a means of following his father's political career, who was part of the ANC himself. While at the University of Fort Hare between 1959 and 1961 Hani was heavily influenced by Marxism, claiming this to be due to the liberal nature of the campus. After completing his Bachelor of Latin and English at the Rhodes University in 1962 Hani joined the Umkhonto we Sizwe (MK), the military wing of the ANC. Due to his commitment to the MK, Hani was arrested under the ‘Suppression of Communism Act’ and exiled to Lesotho in 1963, where he changed his name to Chris (previously Thembisile) to assist in his hiding.

While part of the MK, Hani received military training through the Soviet Union and gained a reputation as a soldier of the black army through serving in the Zimbabwean War of Liberation in 1967, acting as the Political Commissioner in the Zimbabwe People's Revolutionary Army (ZIPRA). In 1974 Hani travelled to the German Democratic Republic (GDR) where he engaged in guerrilla command training for a period of three months before marrying Limpho Sekamane (now Limpho Hani) in Lusaka. Due to his integral role in MK organised guerrilla operations, Hani became the target of assassination attempts from 1981, including a failed car bomb assassination attempt by Ernest Ramatolo on 2 August.

Hani returned permanently to South Africa after the unbanning of the ANC in 1990 and quickly became a figurehead of the South African extreme left. Despite the collapse of Communist momentum in Europe, Hani campaigned heavily for the SACP (South African Communist Party) as General-Secretary from 1991. On 7 September 1992, he played an integral role leading a procession of 80,000 people at Victoria Stadium before the mass came under machine gun fire, leading to the death of 28 in an event which became known as the Bisho Massacre. Hani held his General-Secretary position within SACP until his assassination on 10 April 1993.

== Context ==
After the election of the white-dominant National Party in 1948, South Africa was characterised by apartheid, an ingrained and dominating system of institutionalised segregation which encouraged the discrimination of coloured demographics. The strength of apartheid at this time was founded upon a political culture of white supremacy, in particular by those of the Conservative Party and National Party, and was adopted by the South African government as formal policy in 1948. In 1950 the Population Registration Act provided a framework of segregation by formally categorising South African citizens by various racial classes.

During this time anti-apartheid political groups such as the Afrapix and ANC became heavily organised and employed both passive and aggressive methods to challenge the longevity of apartheid. From 1963 until 1990 Nelson Mandela, founder of the Umkhonto we Sizwe (MK) was imprisoned resulting in international support of anti-apartheid progress. From 1985 the United Kingdom and United States imposed an economic sanction upon South Africa, especially upon the importation of coal and uranium, in attempt to strong-arm a democratic election. These sanctions alongside pressure from the United Nations were largely ineffective due to various loop-holes and the independent strength of the South African economy. In 1994 South Africa held its first full democratic election inclusive of all racial votes, resulting in the election of the African National Congress who secured 63.1% of the popular vote and 252 seats in the National Assembly. The ANC has been the governing party of South Africa since then.

== Assassination ==
On 10 April 1993 Hani was assassinated while stepping out of his car at his home in Dawn Park, Boksburg, by radical right-wing Polish immigrant Janusz Waluś. Hani was shot at approximately 10:20am and died at the scene. During the attack Hani received two bullets to the chest and an additional two sub-sonic bullets to the head. With him at the time was his daughter Nomakhwezi, then fifteen years old. Margareta Harmse, an Afrikaans housewife, recognised Waluś and his vehicle and immediately called the police, leading to his arrest and interrogation by Sergeant Holmes of the Boksburg Murder and Robbery Squad by 7pm the same day.

Soon after, Clive Derby-Lewis, the Shadow Minister for Economic Affairs for the Conservative Party of South Africa at the time, was arrested for complicity in Hani's assassination as he had lent Waluś the modified Z88 9 mm pistol used in the attack. The pistol used was unlicensed and stolen from the military by accomplice Jean Taylor through Edwin Clarke and had been in the possession of Derby-Lewis since his preparation for the crime in February. While on trial, Derby-Lewis expressed his desire to engage the country into a race war to disrupt the reconciliation progress ahead of the proposed 1994 democratic elections, a time at which negotiations regarding the ending of apartheid were at a climax. During investigations, police uncovered a list of assassination targets compiled by Waluś and Derby-Lewis that featured the residential addresses and names of figurehead left-wing political leaders including Joe Slovo and Nelson Mandela.

== Aftermath ==
Following the assassination, riots broke out in Cape Town, Durban and Port Elizabeth due to the tension between the extreme left and far right. There were seven deaths, including three as a result of police fire. It was estimated that over 6 million black workers engaged in a one-day strike to commemorate Hani on 15 April 1993. This mass disruption led to a decision for a democratic election to take place on 27 April 1994. According to Jeremy Cronin, then Deputy Secretary of the SACP (South African Communist Party), the actions of Waluś and Derby-Lewis came close to "plunging South Africa into civil war".

In response to the assassination, Mandela, though not yet President, addressed the nation on 14 April 1993 to call urgently for peace.

'Tonight I am reaching out to every single South African, black and white, from the very depths of my being. A white man, full of prejudice and hate, came to our country and committed a deed so foul that our whole nation now teeters on the brink of disaster. A white woman, of Afrikaner origin, risked her life so that we may know, and bring to justice, this assassin. The cold-blooded murder of Chris Hani has sent shock waves throughout the country and the world. ... Now is the time for all South Africans to stand together against those who, from any quarter, wish to destroy what Chris Hani gave his life for – the freedom of all of us.’

— Nelson Mandela

== Conspiracy ==
Several conspiracy theories have emerged suggesting the involvement of alternate political agendas in the Hani assassination, including suggestions by arms-deal investigator Terry Crawford-Browne regarding the involvement of Joe Modise, the longstanding leader of MK, due to engrained corruption within the ANC. Additionally theories suggest collusion between Clive Derby-Lewis and Thabo Mbeki, second President of South Africa, due to the large political gain he received as a result of the Hani assassination. These claims, however, have not been investigated due to the testimonies of both Waluś and Derby-Lewis.

Media claims and National Intelligence Agency reports since the 2015 Truth and Reconciliation Commission hearing have suggested the involvement of a conspiracy from the Vlakplaas C-10 counterinsurgency police force within the initial stages of the murder. It is believed that intelligence operatives within the Boksburg general police are linked to the plot. These claims have not been publicly pursued.

== Assassins ==
=== Janusz Waluś ===
Janusz Waluś was born in communist Poland on 14 January 1953 and gained residence in South Africa in 1981 to work as a glass maker and truck driver with his father and brother. Later, Waluś joined the National Party and Afrikaner Weerstandsbeweging, committing his support of far-right politics and their goals to suppress the spread of communism and racial equality through South Africa. Prior to 1993 Waluś became strongly involved with Clive Derby-Lewis and planned a string of political assassinations. Although not testifying at trial, during his 1997 amnesty hearing Waluś openly emphasised the political intent of the assassination "to plunge the country into a state of chaos which would allow the right to take over", and recalled his experiences in Communist Poland as personal motivation for the crimes. Further, Waluś expressed the influence of the Conservative Party in his crimes, ""I did it for the CP and to stop communists and radicals from gaining power in this country".

=== Clive Derby-Lewis ===
Clive Derby-Lewis was a founding member of the Conservative Party and served as the Shadow Minister for Economic Affairs at the time of Chris Hani's assassination. Due to his strong public support of apartheid and extreme right-wing policies, Derby-Lewis has been described by Harry Schwartz, his opposing minister, as the "biggest racist in Parliament". Derby-Lewis was tied to the murder of Chris Hani due to his conspiracy with Janusz Waluś for the murder of key anti-apartheid members, and the supply of the handgun used in the assassination of Chris Hani. His motivations for his involvement are believed to be due to a political race between the ANC and the National Party who were expected to be dominant parties during the reformation of the South African democracy during the proposed upcoming elections in 1994.

However, due to a renewed Constitutional ruling in 1995, their sentences were commuted to a life sentence that, until 1997, did not permit the application for future parole or amnesty. At his trial Janusz Waluś never testified. Wife Gaye Derby-Lewis was also tried by the Supreme Court in Johannesburg however was acquitted despite her involvement within the Conservative Party until 1989.

Nelson Mandela established the Truth and Reconciliation Commission in December 1995 to enable the exposure of all political crimes during the apartheid in attempt to assist South Africa's transition to democracy. In 1997 Waluś and Derby-Lewis applied for amnesty to the Truth and Reconciliation Commission on the grounds that their actions were political in nature, and that the assassination was as result of orders from the Conservative Party. Hani's family was represented by George Bizos in a trial that lasted from 24 to 27 November 1997. Throughout their individual hearings multiple discrepancies came to light regarding the methods and motivations as told by Derby-Lewis and Waluś. The claims by both convicted were denied by the commission.

Throughout his sentence Derby-Lewis continued to apply for parole which was accepted after several failed attempts due to the terminal condition of his lung cancer in June 2015. Derby-Lewis died of his cancer on 3 November 2016. Janusz Waluś continued to apply for parole through the North Gauteng High Court in Pretoria which was accepted, however was later rejected in the Supreme Court of Appeal in April 2015 by Michael Masutha, Minister for Justice and Correctional Services. In all cases Waluś has been denied parole due to his lacking remorse and retained political ideology.

On 10 March 2016, the North Gauteng High Court ordered Waluś to be released on parole under bail conditions. The Department of Justice and Correctional Services lodged an appeal against the parole decision to the Supreme Court of Appeal in Bloemfontein. The Department of Home Affairs has indicated that Waluś may have his South African citizenship revoked. On 18 August 2017, the Supreme Court of Appeal in Bloemfontein overturned Waluś's parole, a decision that was welcomed by the SACP. By October 2019, Waluś was still in prison, despite his lawyer's claim that he is completely rehabilitated. On 16 March 2020, Waluś was again denied parole by Justice Minister Ronald Lamola. On 7 December 2022, Waluś was granted parole under strict conditions by Justice Minister Ronald Lamola. In 2024, the government announced that Waluś was to be deported to Poland on 6 December with the Polish government paying for the proceedings.
