= Limpho Hani =

South African activist and widow of Chris Hani (born 1948)

Member of the National Assembly
- In office May 1994 – August 1999
- Succeeded by: Kay Moonsamy

Personal details
- Born: Limpho Sekamane; 31 January 1948 (age 78) Maseru, Basutoland
- Citizenship: South Africa
- Party: African National Congress
- Spouse: Chris Hani (m. 1973; died 1993)

Limpho Hani (née Sekamane; born 31 January 1948) is a Mosotho–South African activist who is the widow of anti-apartheid activist Chris Hani. After her husband was assassinated in 1993, she had her own brief political career in the post-apartheid government, representing the African National Congress (ANC) in the National Assembly from May 1994 to August 1999. She also served on the ANC's National Executive Committee during that period. She has since remained in the public eye, partly because of the national symbolic importance of her husband's murder and partly because of her own activism in seeking to oppose parole for the killers.

== Early life ==
She was born Limpho Sekamane on 31 January 1948 and is from Sea Point in Maseru, the capital of Lesotho.

== Life with Chris Hani: 1973–1993 ==
She married Chris Hani in 1974 at a magistrate's court in Lusaka, Zambia; they had a celebratory wedding lunch at Wimpy. After her wedding, Hani spent time studying overseas in Yugoslavia, but upon her return to Southern Africa in late 1975, she and her husband moved into a house in Lithabaneng in the suburbs of Maseru; the house came to be known to ANC members as "Moscow House". The couple had three daughters together: Neo, Nomakhwezi, and Lindiwe. Nomakhwezi died aged 23 in 2001.

Hani's husband was a senior leader in Umkhonto we Sizwe (MK), the armed wing of the African National Congress (ANC), and the South African Communist Party (SACP); the organisations were at that time operating in exile in Southern Africa – primarily out of Lusaka – because they were banned by the apartheid government in South Africa. Hani herself worked for the Lesotho Tourism Board, but she also became increasingly involved in MK operations; after the 1976 Soweto Uprising swelled the ANC's numbers, she was personally involved in smuggling new MK recruits across the South African border and through Swaziland. She was detained by the South African authorities for several months in 1977–1978 and during that time, according to her husband's biographer Hugh Macmillan, she gave evidence for the apartheid state against Mountain Qumbela, a former ANC leader in the Cape.

Hani's husband was subject to an assassination attempt in 1982, and in the aftermath she left her job at the Lesotho Tourism Board to move with him to Lusaka. She returned to Maseru in 1984 and took up employment with the local office of the Swedish International Development Cooperation Agency and then, from 1985, at the Swedish Embassy in Maseru. Hani and her family moved to South Africa in 1990 after the ANC was unbanned during the negotiations to end apartheid. During an advanced stage of the negotiations, on 10 April 1993, Chris Hani was assassinated outside their home in Dawn Park in Boksburg; his teenage daughter Nomakhwezi was with him.

== Political career: 1994–1999 ==
In South Africa's first post-apartheid elections in April 1994, Hani was elected to represent the ANC as a Member of the National Assembly, the lower house of the new South African Parliament. She was re-elected in the next general election in June 1999, but she resigned from her seat on 17 August 1999; her seat was filled by Kay Moonsamy. At the same time, she served on the National Executive Committee of the ANC: she was first elected onto the body at the ANC's 49th National Conference in Bloemfontein in December 1994 and she was re-elected in December 1997, but she resigned during her second term "due to other commitments".

== TRC and widowhood ==
In the immediate and long-term aftermath of her husband's murder, Hani did not abide sentiments of forgiveness towards the killers, leading Sisonke Msimang to describe "her public refusal to forgive" as "almost heretical" given the conciliatory nation-building narrative exemplified by Nelson Mandela, South Africa's first post-apartheid president. During the post-apartheid Truth and Reconciliation Commission, two right-wing extremists, assassin Janusz Waluś and accomplice Clive Derby-Lewis, expressed regret to the family and applied for amnesty for their role in the murder, but Hani and her family – represented by George Bizos – vociferously, and successfully, opposed amnesty.

When a court approved medical parole for Derby-Lewis in 2014, Hani expressed outrage, saying that it was "a very sad day in South Africa". In 2022, Waluś was also granted parole, but only after a sustained campaign by Hani and the SACP to block it. Explaining her decision to continue opposing Waluś's parole, Hani told the media:

This chap, whatever his name is, he murdered my husband in cold blood which resulted in my late daughter [Nomakhwezi] attempting to commit suicide twice... this child was going for counseling for six years and then died. In my view, he killed my husband and my daughter... this chap, I won't say his name, 20 years later he says he is sorry. He doesn't say it to me... I will never forgive. He took my husband's life [and] he took my children father... why should I forgive him?... I will never forgive him. All I am asking for is justice nothing more, nothing less.

The case was ultimately arbitrated by the Constitutional Court, which ruled in November 2022 that the Minister of Justice and Correctional Services had been irrational in denying parole to Waluś, who had been eligible for release for more than 15 years. In a widely publicised outburst, Hani stormed out of the court after the verdict and told reporters that the judgement was "diabolical" and that the court and Chief Justice Raymond Zondo had "failed this country completely". She said, "This country is finished. In this country, a foreign white [Polish Waluś] can come into South Africa and kill my husband". She also expressed sympathy with the views of Minister Lindiwe Sisulu, who had recently received public attention for attacks on the judiciary and who Hani said was "the only one in this country who saw through these guys". A subsequent application by Hani and the SACP for rescission of the court's order was unanimously dismissed.
