= Chris Hani Memorial =

Memorial in Boksburg, South Africa

Chris Hani Monument
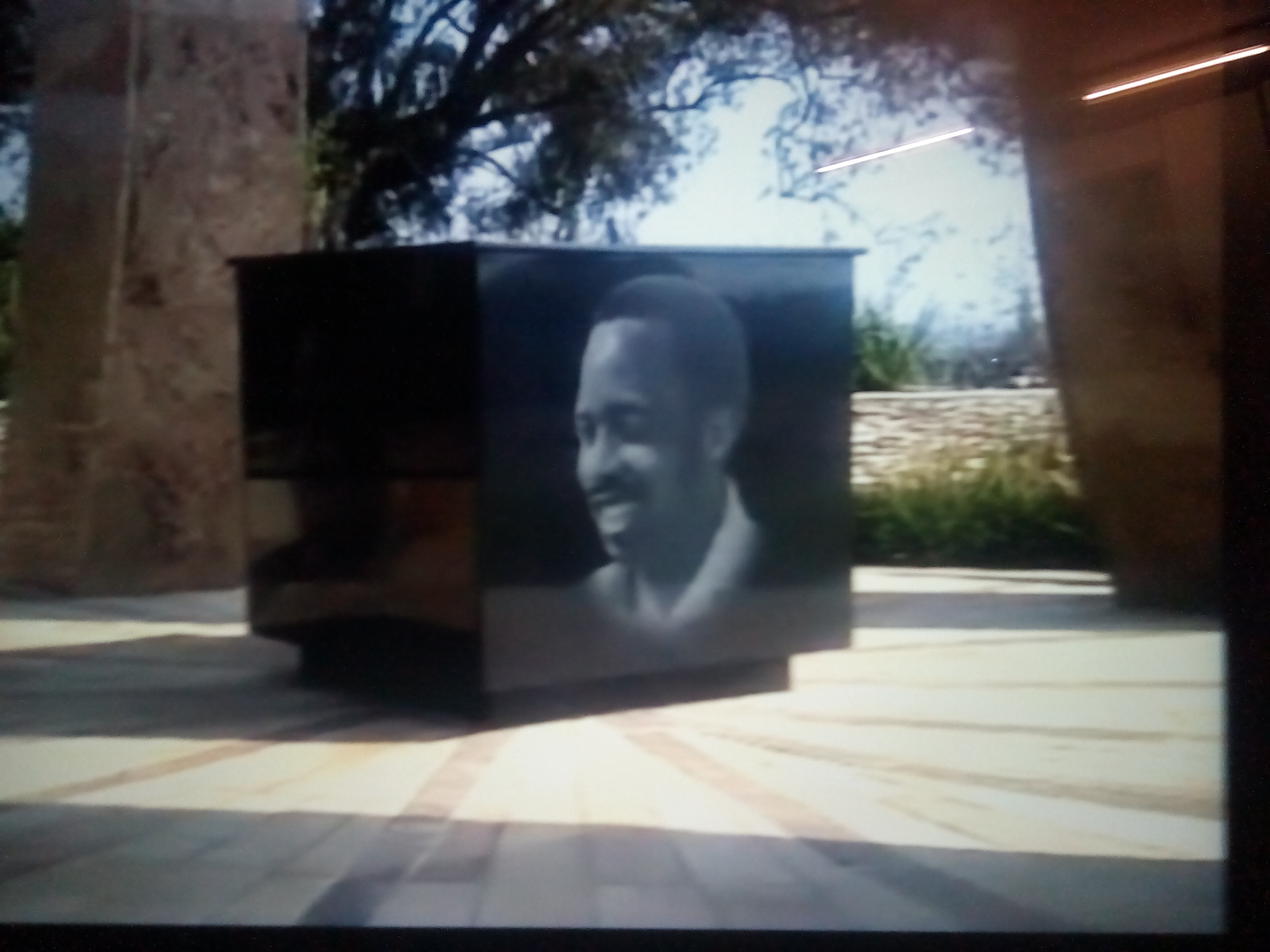
- A view of the Chris Hani Monument
- Interactive map of Chris Hani Monument
- Location: South Park Cemetery, Boksburg, Ekurhuleni Metropolitan Municipality, Gauteng, South Africa
- Coordinates: 26.2795°S 28.2238°E
- Designer: Werner Bester and Lynette Weitz from BW Design www.bwdesign.co.za BW Design Consulting Architects
- Material: granite concrete, sandstone glass
- Opening date: 2015-04-10
- Dedicated to: Chris Hani

The Chris Hani Memorial commemorates the life of Chris Hani, and celebrates his far-reaching political legacy.

== The Monument ==
The memorial takes the form of a circle to symbolize unity, equality and inclusion. The five circles represent the five decades of the life shared so selflessly. The circular stairs encourage interactions, illustrating his warm personality, hospitality and philosophy of sharing.

From the middle of the podium, strong lines radiate outwards to symbolize the ripple effect that Chris Hani had on the lives of millions of people, both in his personal and political lives. A granite cube is placed at the top of the podium bearing a sand-blasted profile of Chris Hani on each side. The Memorial is placed on angle 32 degrees to the existing grave of Chris Hani. The number reflects the years that Chris was a member of the South African Communist Party (SACP) and the angle allows for an optimal view of the grave from the shaded bench, creating a strong visual connection. His selfless nature, vision, wisdom, dedication and compassion he dispensed so generously is expressed through the five concretes columns supporting the cantilevered concrete roof over the granite bench. The SACP's popular slogan “for the workers and the poor” was not just words but a principle which guided Chris Hani's life. Those ideals are reflected through the use of natural materials and the inclusion of nature in the design symbolizing his dignity through simplicity, as well as his close ties to his rural base. This four granite column represent the four pillars and the underpinning the struggle. The shape of the pillars is significant in its reference to the wild Gladiolus. Around the Memorial there are flowers and these flowers are endemic to the Transkei (birthplace of Chris Hani) sporting long and narrow leaves that resembles swords. This is a true reflection of Chris Hani, the gladiator with the heart of a poet.

=== The Walk of Remembrance ===
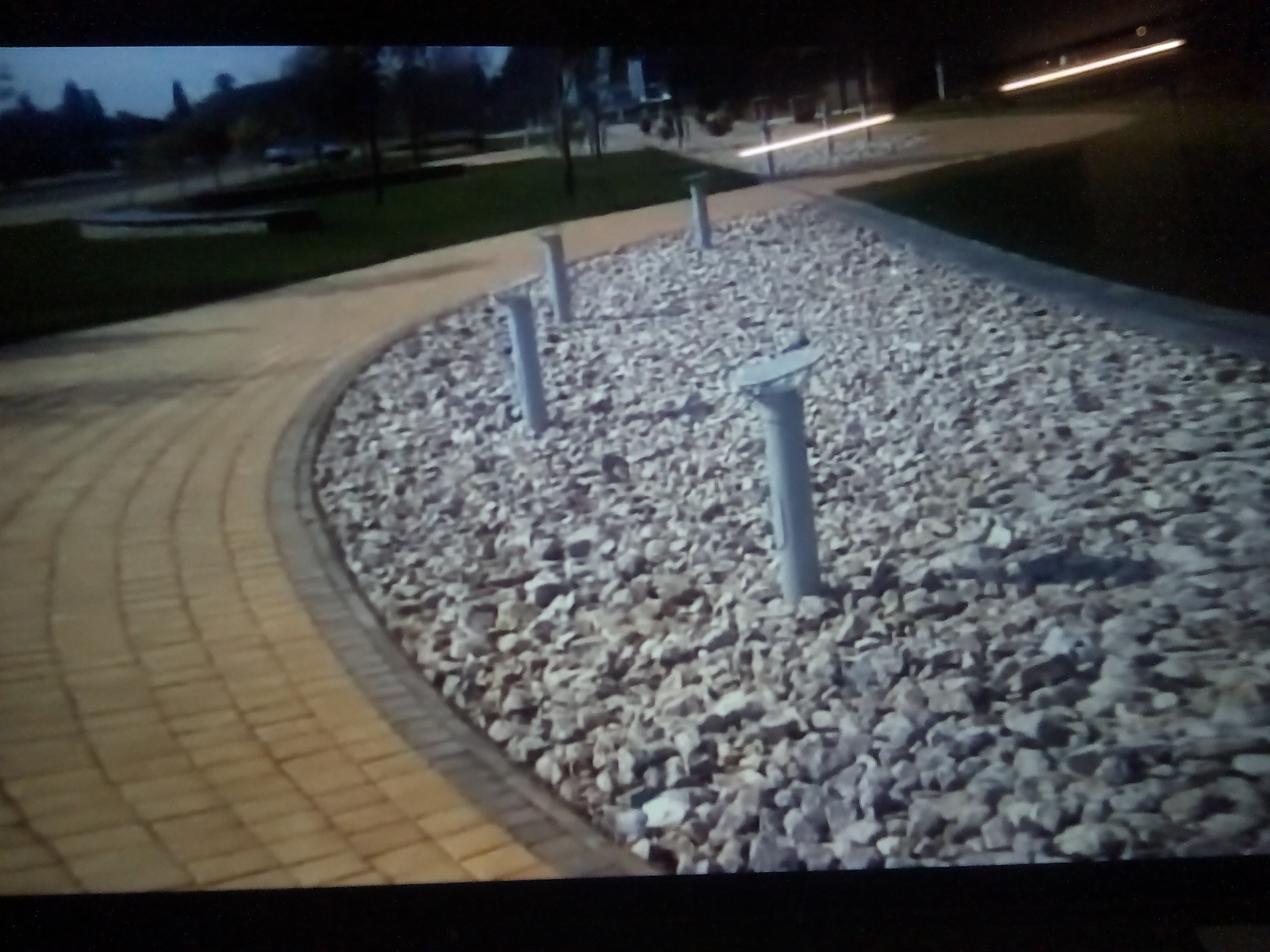
Walk of Remembrance

The Walk of Remembrance is a curving and contemplative meander, uniting the Chris Hani memorial and the Wall of Remembrance in a single, captivating journey through the trials of struggle heroes in the serenity of the national Highveld landscape. This serene walk below the canopy of trees has an air of solitude, and benches are provided to allow for relaxed reflection. The Wall of Remembrance and the Chris Hani Memorial are placed directly opposite to one another, serving as a single interconnected memorial to the legacy of the struggle veterans and leaders. The visual connection is enhanced through a solid uninterrupted line of black granite from the Wall of Remembrance straight through to the Chris Hani Memorial. The circular shape has been used to symbolize the circle of life. The circular path represents the completion of the paths taken by all the heroes represented. Their paths have all converged upon unity and wholeness, and the circle completes their journey towards wholeness. Indigenous trees are placed along the Walk of Remembrance plays an integral part in the design as a constant reminder of the hope that lived within the hearts of the heroes. Lighting provided along the Walk of Remembrance plays an integral part in the design as a constant reminder of the hope that lived within the hearts of the heroes – the burning desire that could not be extinguished and eventually led to a new South Africa.

=== The Wall of Remembrance ===
The Wall of Remembrance is a celebration of the lives of the martyrs of South Africa's struggle for the freedom of all humanity. Their political lives reflects principles of democracy, striving towards transparency and dialogue. To demonstrate the martyrs’ unflinching belief in this goal, foundation of their belief in justice, which formed the basis for the new South Africa. The concrete podium is elevated to give the heroes appropriate recognition and pay tributes to their sacrifice. The podium is anchored by a solid granite wall, lending mass and solidity to the structure. The wall houses the name of the structure as well as a map of the routes. Three glass boxes are placed on the podium as a symbol of democracy, transparency and inclusivity. The form is a reference to the existing needle commemorating the lives of fallen members of South African Services and are in close proximity to engage dialogue. The names of all the fallen heroes are sand-blasted on the glass walls and visitors are invited to wall around the glass boxes and share the history of heroes that helped shaped the new political South Africa. Natural materials are used throughout the project, to create texture and an organic Earth-like feel.

=== Materials used ===
Material used are: granite concrete, sandstone glass.

== Video tour ==
Zimisele Secondary school students produced the following video tours of the Chris Hani Memorial, showing the monument; Walk of remembrance and the Wall of remembrance as part of their entry to this Wikipedia article.

Chris Hani monument tour

Chris Hani walk of remembrance tour
