= Red Dust (novel) =

Novel by Gillian Slovo

- Author: Gillian Slovo
- Language: English
- Genre: courtroom drama, thriller, Philosophical
- Publisher: Virago, Klett
- Publication date: 2000
- Publication place: UK
- Media type: Print, (audio-CD)
- Pages: 340 pp
- ISBN: 978-0-393-32399-3
- OCLC: 51915204

Red Dust is a 2000 novel written by South African-born Gillian Slovo that is structured around the hearings of the Truth and Reconciliation Commission (TRC) in the fictional town Smitsrivier. Its key theme centers around the question of truth.

In post-apartheid South Africa, retired anti-apartheid activist and lawyer Ben Hoffman cannot turn down James Sizela's wish to use the Truth and Reconciliation Commission (TRC) hearing of local ex-police officer Dirk Hendricks to find out what happened to James's son Steve who has been missing since the mid-1980s confrontation between white state authorities and the black African National Congress (ANC). But Ben knows he cannot accept this case alone as he is ill and his powers are waning. He calls his former student, New York prosecutor Sarah Barcant to return to South Africa to help him with the amnesty hearing.

They hope that the questioning of MP Alex Mpondo, a torture victim of Dirk and comrade of Steve, in connection with the TRC's full disclosure law, will enable them to get hold of Pieter Muller, Smitsrivier's former police boss, who they think killed Steve Sizela. Intended to reconcile South Africans with the violent chapter of their country's past, the hearings turn out to open up old wounds, as well as create new ones, making the characters face the truth or their ideas of it.

== Biographical context ==
Gillian Slovo's interest in the TRC derives from her family background that is deeply rooted in the struggle against apartheid. In fact, her parents are the only whites buried in Soweto's Avalon Cemetery.

Her father, Joe Slovo, led the South African Communist Party and was also a leading figure of the African National Congress. He is also one of the leaders of Umkhonto we Sizwe, the military wing of the ANC, founded in the early 1960s. Joe Slovo returned to South Africa in 1990 to take part in the negotiations between ANC and the white government about a peaceful transition towards democracy. He later served as Minister for Housing under Nelson Mandela until his death in 1995.

Ruth First, Gillian's mother, was a determined activist as well. She worked, after having to flee South Africa in 1964, at various English universities before returning to the continent in 1978 to continue her struggle at the Universidade Eduardo Mondlane in Maputo, Mozambique. On 17 August 1982, she was murdered by a parcel bomb sent by the South African Security Force.

She acknowledges that Red Dust is a direct result of her mother's death. She wrote, "The seeds of it were born out of my grave-side realisation that if the country would not leave me alone, then I would have to face it". Gillian Slovo experienced the workings of the TRC herself when she faced the murderer of her mother, Craig Williamson, in amnesty hearings in South Africa. She described the trial as extremely painful, especially given the result that Williamson received amnesty. Yet, she understood the way they (the Security Police) thought and used her personal experiences of unwanted intimacy in Red Dust. Her attitude towards the TRC is reflected in her assumption that "It helps a whole society reconcile itself to its past, without ignoring or denying it."

In an interview Slovo said:

We don't dictate all the experiences we are going to endure, the difficult experiences we're going to endure in life, and we do the best we can through them … but I think in the long term, I think in the long term it was a kind of settling kind of experience. Because I think in the long term I think it is true, the truth does settle you, there's this slogan the Truth Commission has, it's 'the truth will set you free', and I'm very opposed to slogans, you know, they're everything that I as a writer don't believe in. I think you've got to go for complexity rather than simplicity, and to my great surprise, the truth did set me free.

== Characterizations ==
Alex Mpondo

ANC- activist Alex Mpondo comes back to Smitsrivier, the city he grew up in, to face his former torturer Dirk Hendricks in order to help the Sizela family to find their murdered son Steve, Mpondo's friend as well as comrade in the struggle.

Alex Mpondo was tortured for supplying the ANC with weaponry for the fight against the apartheid regime. He was caught and arrested along with Steve Sizela who he saw the last time being carried out of the prison almost dead. This caused an inner conflict about his responsibility of Steve's death because he isn't sure whether he broke in his interrogation and betrayed him by revealing his identity or not. To escape this struggle he left the town in 1985 and now is a Member of Parliament.

Returning home people portray him as a "charismatic" "ladies man". Sarah Barcant, his lawyer in his amnesty hearing, notices first his strong hands, the blue Jeans and the white T-shirt that hung beautifully from his boxer's shoulders. For her he has "so much of the city about him". The image of the successful MP turns out to be only a facade he puts up to protect himself from his guilty conscience. All this time he has dealt with the problem by repressing his past. He tries to "put Steve out of his mind [and] buried him as surely as Steve himself has been buried". But the question, if he sealed his friend's fate, is still dominating his life: "Steve's death: his fault?"

Alex comes only back on James Sizela's request, who holds him accountable for his son's death. "It is all for James's sake, (…), not for his own".

Alex himself is scared to oppose Dirk Hendricks, because his past is going to be excavated. In the beginning of the hearings, he tries to keep up his barrier to prevent Dirk Hendricks's narrative, his version of history, becoming his own. Sometimes, when his past gets a grip on him, he is unpredictable and shows hidden facets of his personality, like a "chameleon".

But the urge to know the answer to his question drives him to keep cross-examining Dirk Hendricks, although he in many situations reaches the point, where he simply wants to quit. He can't stand the intimacy between his torturer and himself, knowing that "he'll turn the screws on him". Alex is ashamed of the fact that he might have broken by telling the place of the weapon storage and also anxious that by revealing this in court he could also lose his reputation of a hero. In his opinion Dirk has turned him white: "He was no longer black".

In the end Alex Mpondo still doesn't know the truth, but yet he has gained a lot from facing Dirk Hendricks. By talking and reliving the events once more, he is now able to find a way to handle his emotions and to close with the past. He developed a working relationship to his lawyer Sarah Barcant, who forced him to continue the hearings. This climaxes in a love scene, which also is the last one since both of them prefer to continue their individual paths in life.

Dirk Hendricks

Dirk Hendricks is one of the main characters in Red Dust. He is imprisoned for some other crime he committed during the time of apartheid. He is scared of being imprisoned once again, so he applies for amnesty and Dirk a jailbird that he looked like shit.

These were Pieter Muller's first thoughts when he saw Dirk after coming out of the van. Because of his time in prison he lost nearly everything, including his family and his job. He has PTSD and has lost his bearings in the new South Africa. Only his friendship to Pieter still remains. His last chance to finally obtain freedom is to apply for amnesty in front of the TRC. In fact Pieter Muller is guilty of murder. Dirk now is indecisive whether to stay loyal to Pieter or to tell the whole truth.

From his point of view he didn't do anything criminal, he was ordered to do so in that special time of riot and trouble. He only did his duty. He was a patriot and believed in fighting for the right cause. His true self is only revealed to Alex. A main part of the story hinges on their intimate relationship of torturer and victim.

Sarah Barcant

Sarah Barcant, a 36-year-old lawyer from New York, a typical career woman, well-dressed with fashionable clothes and "high heels", comes back to her past.

She is living in New York but was born in Smitsrivier, where she grew up and lived with her parents in the Main Street. Her father was an optician, but nevertheless he "had not made enough money to move his family of Main Street to Francis Avenue, which was home to most of Smitsrivier white population" (p. 33).

She got the chance to study law and to move to New York with the help of Ben Hoffmann, her mentor. There she started a new life. After the end of apartheid her parents moved to Perth, Australia. Fourteen years later she now gets a telephone call from Ben, who needs her help for a new case in South Africa. Back in Smitsrivier she remembers her past and childhood. Everything has changed, but it is her who has changed most. She feels a bond to South Africa but doesn't belong there anymore.

She is only focused on the case and not on the people around her and especially her client Alex Mpondo. Sarah is doing her job very accurately, "It's called preparation. I was taught to do it properly". She loves her job and shows good skills as a lawyer. One example is the hearing of Dirk Hendricks, where she puts him under pressure. Ben Hoffmann, however sees her different behaviour: "You are no longer the person I knew or the lawyer I trained. You think like a prosecutor. Is that what New York has done to you? Did it turn you into such an unfeeling monster?".

At first, she just wants to find out the truth and does not really care about the individual emotions and trauma involved, but just wants to do a good job. In the end she has changed. When she lies to Alex about his share in Steve's death, she bends the truth to help him.

One important relationship is the one to Ben Hoffman, her mentor. They met when he was middle-aged, and she was fourteen. Ben changed her life because he taught her and then gave her the possibility to go to New York as a lawyer. He helped her in every situation, "he had shared his life with her, outside of his work". Sarah was always like a daughter to him. He still wants her to stay permanently: "Without Smitsrivier, without South Africa, you will always be less than you could ever have been."

Pieter Muller

Pieter Muller is the second character that is portrayed in the book. When the reader first encounters him, he is in his bedroom and wakes up because he thinks he heard something. He then goes outside with his dogs to check if everything is all right. When he finds nothing, he begins to puzzle about why he woke up and figures out that it must have been because of the TRC and James Sizela.

Pieter is described as a thickset man with a big square face with narrow eyes, and heavy jowls resting on a bullish neck. He has downy ginger hair and a fading ginger beard. He has an air of authority over him and 'always moves with purpose'. He makes a living as the boss of a small security company in Smitsrivier. In the past Pieter worked as a police officer. There he interrogated Steve Sizela and tortured him for over a month until he died after he and Dirk put a wager on who would break his suspect first. He doesn't think that his actions were wrong. He says: "Steve's death was an oversight. [...] It was my hand that knocked his head against the wall, that knocked his brains out." This also shows how little remorse he shows for what he did. In the past he must have had a bad conscience though, because he makes Dirk bury the body while getting away with some weak excuse – he had to go to church – which also was his "death sentence". He tries to actively ignore the past – which makes him seem very stubborn and ignorant.

Pieter cares deeply for his wife Mary, who is sick and needs help to get around the house and he is always looking after her. He sometimes still longs for how she used to be ("...but no, that version of his wife existed only in the past..." ). Another side of Pieter is that of a cold manipulator; he tries to influence Dirk Hendricks to not reveal any critical information. He also manipulates James Sizela to shoot him in the end of the book. He does this so that he doesn't have to go to the TRC and apply for amnesty, because it would be against his ideals, he would rather die than admit that he was wrong and beg for mercy. He also wants to cash in his insurance to make sure that his wife gets the support she needs.

James Sizela

"Perjury, perjury, in the highest degree. "How does this quote relate to the character of James Sizela?" James Sizela is an African, grey-haired old man with cinnamon bark skin, high cheek bones, a high forehead and gently slanting eyes. As headmaster of the local school, he wears an old-fashioned pinstripe suit, which fits his general behaviour as he is stern and unmoving. He sees himself as a man of the old school and follows the principles of probity, morality and integrity. He teaches those principles at school and also raised his son, Steve, in that manner. Even though he wants to bury his long dead and missing son he does not really do a lot to support Sarah Barcant, who fights in court to find the body. James even gets angry when she wants to talk to him during class while he should be teaching. This is one example for his attitude towards work and duty, which is one of his higher priorities. He even misses the amnesty hearing of his son's murderer to go to work. This makes him look uninterested and not caring. In general, he is quiet, and it seems James doesn't allow emotions at all and doesn't comfort his wife after Steve's remains are recovered. The latter shows that James Sizela has a problem with bonding and relationships which Pieter Muller proves when he talks to James about Steve. This is one of the moments James shows the one emotion he knows: anger. In fact, he gets angry enough, when Pieter Muller tells him he is responsible for his son's death, to lose control and to kill Pieter, even though he is not himself at that moment, in doing so, he commits "Perjury of the highest degree" to his principles of probity, morality and integrity. As Muller's wife wrongly insists on her husband having killed himself, she further denies James to deal with his action. He resigns from his teaching position. The character James Sizela is quite important to interpret Red Dust, because he shows that everybody can become a killer given the "right" circumstances.

Ben Hoffmann

"He looks […] frail like a broken doll." Ben Hoffmann is an ageing white lawyer who has already retired and who has spent all his skill and expertise into representing black people in court, even in the time of apartheid. He lives with his wife Anna in their house in town. They have a strict daily routine, treating each other with much respect. "In the fifty years they'd shared a bed, he'd never taken more than half unless invited to". They don't have any children, but Sarah Barcant, Ben's former student, more or less takes a daughter-role for Ben. Ben still treats Sarah like his student instead of as a grown-up who already worked as a prosecutor in New York for several years. He is a stubborn person, who refuses to give up his professional principles as a lawyer, even though he is severely ill. "I'm dying". "It had nevertheless been a life well lived. A good life, a rewarding life.[…] He had promised himself[…] to live out what remained to him in peace with his Anna".

Ben Hoffman's function in "Red Dust" is to establish the link between the Sizelas and Sarah Barcant. Without him she would never have returned to her homeland South Africa. Also, he serves as the advocate of the moral justification of the TRC in the debates he has with Sarah.

== Structure ==
The novel is told from multiple perspectives using 3rd person selective omniscience. Thus Slovo adds heavily to the message by making the reader see through the eyes of all the characters in this network of truths and lies. Nobody is capable of establishing the truth. Appropriately Slovo cites Shakespeare before she starts her story:

Is not the truth

the truth?

Henry IV, Part I, Act 2 Scene 4

== See also ==
- Red Dust (2004 film adaptation)
