= Gillian Slovo =

South African-born writer (born 1952)

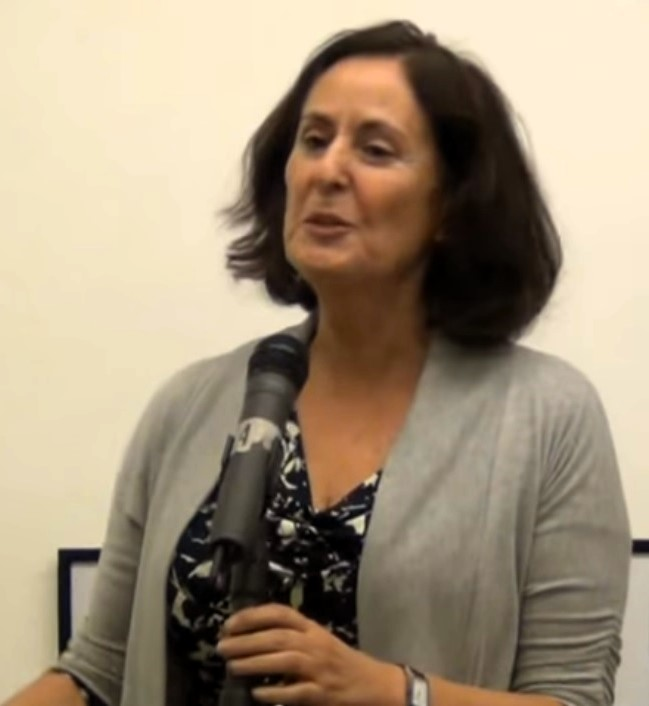
- Slovo in 2011
- Born: 15 March 1952 (age 74)
- Education: University of Manchester
- Occupations: Novelist, playwright
- Parent(s): Joe Slovo, Ruth First
- Relatives: Shawn Slovo, Robyn Slovo (sisters)
- Writing career
- Notable works: Red Dust (2000); Ice Road (2004)

Gillian Slovo (born 15 March 1952) is a South African-born writer who lives in the UK. She was a recipient of the Golden PEN Award.

== Early life and education ==
Gillian Slovo was born on 15 March 1952 in Johannesburg, South Africa, a daughter of Joe Slovo and Ruth First. Her family moved to London in 1964, as political exiles. Her family is Jewish.

Slovo attended the University of Manchester, graduating in 1974 with a bachelor's degree in the history and philosophy of science, before working as a journalist and television producer.

== Career ==
Slovo's novels were at first predominantly of the crime and thriller genres, including a series featuring the detective Kate Baeier, but she has since written more literary fiction. Her 2000 work Red Dust, a courtroom drama that explores the meanings and effects of the South African Truth and Reconciliation Commission, was made into a film of the same name released in 2004, directed by Tom Hooper.

Slovo's 2004 work Ice Road was shortlisted for the Orange Prize for Fiction. The novel incorporates real events (the death of Sergey Kirov) with a fictionalised rendering of life during the Siege of Leningrad.

With Victoria Brittain, Slovo wrote the play Guantanamo: Honor Bound to Defend Freedom, which was staged internationally in 2004.

== Memoirs ==
Slovo's 1997 memoir, Every Secret Thing: My Family, My Country, is an account of her childhood in South Africa and her relationship with her parents Joe Slovo and Ruth First – both South African Communist Party leaders and figures in the anti-apartheid struggle who lived perilous lives of exile, armed resistance, and occasional imprisonment, which culminated in her mother's assassination by South African forces in 1982.

A family memoir in the form of a feature film, A World Apart (1988), was written by her sister Shawn Slovo and starred Barbara Hershey.

== English PEN presidency ==
Slovo was the 25th president (2020–2013) of the English Centre of International PEN, the worldwide writers fellowship. In 2012, she took part in a PEN International delegation to Mexico to protest against the killing of journalists in that country, alongside presidents of other PEN Centres and internationally prominent writers.

== Political views ==
In December 2019, along with 42 other leading cultural figures, Slovo signed a letter endorsing the Labour Party under Jeremy Corbyn's leadership in the 2019 general election. The letter stated that "Labour's election manifesto under Jeremy Corbyn's leadership offers a transformative plan that prioritises the needs of people and the planet over private profit and the vested interests of a few." She is a supporter of the boycott of Israeli cultural institutions. She was an original signatory of the manifesto "Refusing Complicity in Israel's Literary Institutions".

== Bibliography ==
=== Novels ===
==== Kate Baeier mysteries ====
- Morbid Symptoms (1984)
- Death by Analysis (1986)
- Death Comes Staccato (1987)
- Catnap (1994)
- Close Call (1995)

==== Other novels ====
- Ties of Blood (1989)
- The Betrayal (1991)
- Looking for Thelma (1991)
- Façade (1993)
- Red Dust (2000)
- Ice Road (2004)
- Black Orchids (2008)
- An Honourable Man (2012)
- Ten Days (2016)

=== Plays ===
- Guantanamo : Honor Bound to Defend Freedom (with Victoria Brittain) (2005)
- The Riots

=== Biography ===
- Every Secret Thing: My Family, My Country (1997)

== Awards and honours ==
- 2004: Orange Prize for Fiction shortlist for Ice Road
- 2013: Golden PEN Award
- 2013: Fellow of the Royal Society of Literature
