= Shawn Slovo =

South African screenwriter (born 1950)

- Born: 1 January 1950 (age 75)
- Citizenship: South Africa
- Occupation: Screenwriter

Shawn Slovo (born 1950) is a South African screenwriter, best known for the film A World Apart, based on her childhood under apartheid. She is the daughter of South African Communist Party leaders Joe Slovo and Ruth First. She wrote the screenplay for the 2006 film Catch a Fire (also a historical film about apartheid), and for the 2001 film Captain Corelli's Mandolin.

In the late 1970s, she served as Robert De Niro's personal assistant while he made the films Raging Bull and The King of Comedy. She also wrote the screenplay for Muhammad Ali's Greatest Fight.

Slovo lives in London and often works for Working Title Films. Her sister Gillian Slovo is also a writer and her sister Robyn Slovo is a producer.

Slovo's family is Jewish.
