= Clive Derby-Lewis =

South African politician and murderer (1936–2016)

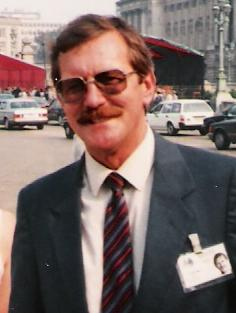

State President's Council
- In office September 1989 – April 1993
- Leader: F. W. De Klerk

Member of Parliament (indirectly elected)
- In office 1987–1989
- Leader: Andries Treurnicht

Personal details
- Born: 22 January 1936 Cape Town, South Africa
- Died: 3 November 2016 (aged 80) Pretoria, South Africa
- Party: Conservative

Clive John Derby-Lewis (22 January 1936 – 3 November 2016) was a South African politician, who was involved first in the National Party and then, while serving as a member of parliament, in the Conservative Party. In 1993, he was convicted of conspiracy to murder South African Communist Party leader Chris Hani and sentenced to death, a sentence which was later reduced to life imprisonment. Derby-Lewis was described as a "right-wing extremist" by The Daily Telegraph; and as someone who "even by South African standards ... has acquired over the years a reputation as a rabid racist" by journalist and South Africa commentator John Carlin.

He was repeatedly denied parole after he began applying in 2010, after objections from the Hani family. After his parole was declined a number of times, his appeal was taken to court where the judge granted him medical parole on 29 May 2015. He was released from prison in June 2015 after serving 22 years, due to terminal lung cancer. He died from the disease on 3 November 2016.

== Background ==
Derby-Lewis, who was born in Cape Town, was a South African with German and Scots ancestry. He grew up in Kimberley and was educated at the then-Christian Brothers' College. He articled as a chartered accountant and worked for both an accounting firm and an oil company; he also became an extraordinary minister of Holy Communion at Blessed Sacrament Church in Johannesburg before he left the Catholic Church in the early 1980s. He later joined the Afrikaanse Protestantse Kerk (English: Afrikaans Protestant Church), notable as a staunch supporter of Apartheid.

He spent nineteen years as a volunteer in the South African Citizen Force and became the youngest ever commanding officer of the Witwatersrand Rifles Regiment, affiliated with the Cameronians. He was awarded the John Chard Medal for long and meritorious service.

== Community and political history ==
Derby-Lewis joined the National Party and became a town councillor for Bedfordview (1972–1977), Deputy Mayor (1973–1974) and ultimately Mayor (1974–1975), and was made a Freeman of the Johannesburg Mini-Council. He served as the member representing Edenvale, Gauteng, on the Transvaal Provincial Council (1972–1981) where he spent several years as the National Party spokesman for Education and Hospital Services. He also served on the boards of numerous other bodies including hospitals, primary and high schools, and a school for physically challenged children.

Through his involvement in politics, he met Gaye Derby-Lewis, a former nun originally from Australia. They married in 1986. This was his second marriage. Derby-Lewis had three children from his first marriage.

== Parliamentary history ==
Derby-Lewis was a founder member of the Conservative Party at the time of its split from the National Party in 1982, due to a softening of the government's apartheid policies of racial segregation. He was a member of the new party's General Council and Parliamentary Caucus until 1993. He also served on the Transvaal Party Council, in addition to the council's Information and Financial Committee.

Following his unsuccessful election bid in the Krugersdorp constituency, Derby-Lewis was nominated as a member of parliament in 1987 (after the then constitution allowed for political parties to nominate members to the House of Assembly, in addition to their elected representatives). Derby-Lewis served on a number of parliamentary committees. He also represented the Conservative Party on the Standing Committees of Parliament dealing with the Provincial Affairs of Natal, as well as Trade and Commerce.

When the Conservative Party became the Official Opposition he was appointed Chief Spokesman on Economic Affairs, Technology and Mineral Affairs. He was the only member of the Conservative Party Parliamentary Caucus to have served in all four levels of government in South Africa.

During his tenure in Parliament, Derby-Lewis and others in the Conservative Party were staunchly opposed by the anti-apartheid Progressive Federal Party. In March 1988, Derby-Lewis was described by opposition leader Harry Schwarz as the "biggest racist in Parliament".

Derby-Lewis lost his seat after the 1989 election, and was subsequently appointed to the State President's Council, an advisory group, where he served as a member of the Economic Affairs and the Amenities Committees.

He visited London twice in an official Conservative Party of South Africa delegation, including that of June 1989, which included their leader, Dr. Andries Treurnicht and Natal party chief Carl Werth. About that time he joined the London-based Western Goals Institute as an honorary Vice-President, and was one of their delegation to the 22nd World Anti-Communist League Conference in Brussels in July 1990.

During his political career Derby-Lewis had a long history of racially inflammatory remarks, a number of which were considered off-putting even by his Conservative Party colleagues who themselves favoured a racially divided South Africa. In 1989 he claimed in Parliament that "If AIDS stops Black population growth it will be like Father Christmas." He was also overheard in 1989 remarking "What a pity" in response to a report by a minister that an aircraft had had to brake to avoid a black man on the runway at Johannesburg's airport (he later apologised, alleging that the comment had just "slipped out"). Commenting on this, Andries Beyers (a senior Conservative Party official at the time) said: "I think sometimes he became an embarrassment to us. He was very, very hardline. He had a calling to bring English-speakers to the CP, but his personal style put them off."

== Assassination of Chris Hani ==
After the arrest of Janusz Waluś, a Polish immigrant to South Africa, for the assassination on 10 April 1993 of Chris Hani (general secretary of the South African Communist Party and leader of the African National Congress's military wing), it appeared that Derby-Lewis was involved. He had abetted Waluś and had aided him by delivering him the gun used in the assassination. A list of senior ANC and South African Communist Party figures had been developed allegedly by Arthur Kemp and included Nelson Mandela and Joe Slovo.

In October 1993, Derby-Lewis was convicted of conspiracy to murder and sentenced to death for his role in the assassination. The sentence was commuted to life imprisonment when capital punishment was outlawed in 1995. Derby-Lewis confessed his role in the assassination in his application to the Truth and Reconciliation Commission for amnesty. He said the assassination was encouraged or sanctioned by senior leaders of the Conservative Party. In his defence, Derby-Lewis said that he was acting "in defence of my people, who were threatened with a Communist take-over." He added that his Christian faith within the Afrikaanse Protestant Church was central to his decision: "As a Christian, my first duty is to the Almighty God before everything else. We were fighting against communism, and communism is the vehicle of the Antichrist."

The amnesty application was denied in April 1999. In 2000, the Cape High Court dismissed an application by Derby-Lewis and Waluś to overturn the Truth and Reconciliation Commission's decision.

Derby-Lewis applied in June 2010 for parole, on the grounds that he was over 70, and was entitled to parole in terms of South African law for having served more than 15 years in prison. The following November, Derby-Lewis's lawyer reported that Derby-Lewis was receiving treatment for skin cancer and prostate cancer, hypertension, and for a gangrenous spot in his leg.

On three further occasions (2011, 2013, and 2015) Derby-Lewis was denied medical parole. According to his representative advocate Roelof du Plessis: "The recommendation of the medical parole advisory board refers to a stage 3b cancer of the right lung with probable or inconclusive spread to the left adrenal glands, is inoperable and there is marginal response to concurrent chemo and radiotherapy with poor prognostic features". He died in November 2016.
