= Ruth First =

South African journalist, scholar and anti-apartheid activist (1925–1982)

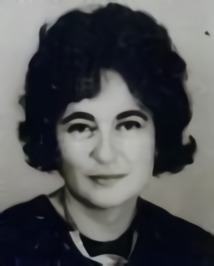
- First c. 1960
- Born: Heloise Ruth First; 4 May 1925; Johannesburg, South Africa
- Died: 17 August 1982 (aged 57); Maputo, Mozambique
- Occupation: Anti-apartheid activist
- Spouse: Joe Slovo
- Children: Shawn Slovo, Gillian Slovo, Robyn Slovo

Heloise Ruth First OLG (4 May 1925 – 17 August 1982) was a South African anti-apartheid activist and scholar. She was assassinated in Mozambique, where she was working in exile, by a parcel bomb built by South African police.

== Family and education ==
Ruth First was born 4 May 1925 in Johannesburg to Jewish parents, Julius First and Matilda Leveta. Julius emigrated to South Africa from Latvia when he was 10 years old, and Matilda emigrated from Lithuania when she was four years old. They were both anti-apartheid activists and became founding members of the Communist Party of South Africa (CPSA), the forerunner of the South African Communist Party (SACP). Ruth First was brought up in Kensington where she and her brother, Ronald First, were raised in a highly political household. At age 14, Ruth was a member of the Young Left Wing Book Club. Like her parents, she joined the Communist Party, which was allied with the African National Congress in its struggle to overthrow the apartheid government of South Africa.

As a teenager, First attended Jeppe High School for Girls and then became the first person in her family to attend university. She received her bachelor's degree in Social Science from the University of the Witwatersrand in 1946, receiving firsts in anthropology, economic history, sociology, and native administration. While she was at university, she found that "on a South African campus, the student issues that matter are national issues". She was involved in the founding of the Federation of Progressive Students, also known as the Progressive Students League, and got to know, among other fellow students, Nelson Mandela, future President of South Africa, and Eduardo Mondlane, the first leader of the Mozambique freedom movement FRELIMO. She was also the secretary of the Young Communist League and for a short time, was active in the Johannesburg CPSA.

After graduating, First worked as a research assistant for the Social Welfare Division of the Johannesburg City Council. In 1946, her position in the Communist Party was boosted significantly after a series of mine strikes during which leading members of the Party were arrested. After this, First requested an interview with the Director of Social Welfare where she announced she would like to leave her department without serving her customary notice first. First then became the editor-in-chief of the radical newspaper The Guardian, which was subsequently banned by the state under the Communism Suppression Act and often changed names due to repressive state actions and media censorship. Through investigative journalism, First exposed the racial segregation policies known as apartheid, targeting black South Africans following the rise of the National Party in 1948.

In 1949, she married Joe Slovo, a South African anti-apartheid activist and Communist, with whom she had three daughters, Shawn, Gillian and Robyn. Together, Slovo and First became a leading force in the 1950s protest era in which the government outlawed any movements that opposed their policies.

In addition to her work with The Guardian and its successors, the South African Congress of Democrats (COD), a White-only wing of the Congress Alliance, was founded in 1953 with support from First when the ANC expressed need for a group of White activists to endorse their policies and break through to members of the Nationalist party. In 1955, she assumed the position of editor of a radical political journal called Fighting Talk. First and Slovo were also members of the African National Congress, in addition to the Communist Party. She also played an active role during the extensive riots of the 1950s. Ruth was on the drafting committee of the Freedom Charter, but was unable to attend its presentation on 25 June 1955 at the Congress of the People at Kliptown due to a banning order. Ruth also traveled to the International Union of Students and the founding conferences of the World Federation of Democratic Youth. She visited the Soviet Union, China, Britain, Italy, Yugoslavia, Germany, and France.

== Treason trial and detention ==
First was one of the defendants in the Treason Trial of 1956–1961, alongside 155 other leading anti-apartheid activists who were key figures in the Congress Alliance. First's early work and writings were largely used as evidence to prove treason on behalf of the Congress Alliance.

Following four years of harassment by the state, First alongside the 155 other activists were all acquitted of their charges. After the state of emergency that followed the Sharpeville massacre in 1960, she was listed and banned. She could not attend meetings or publish, and she could not be quoted. Her husband was arrested, and she fled to Swaziland with their children in order to avoid arrest. During the second half of the state of emergency, she returned to Johannesburg with her children secretly and lived underground. In 1961, Ruth traveled to Namibia to interview the native Africans in the region. Though she was refused access to archived records, the material she collected during her four-day trip was used to write her first book South West Africa (owning a copy was punishable by up to five years in prison). Around this time she also helped arrange the first broadcasts of Radio Freedom in Johannesburg. Following this trip, Ruth was restricted for five years to the magisterial district of Johannesburg. In 1963, during the raid on Lilliesleaf Farm in Rivonia, multiple high ranking activists including Nelson Mandela were captured and given life in prison. Neither Ruth or her husband was present at the time of the raid. However, Ruth was arrested by security police in the main hall of Witwatersrand Library. She was imprisoned and held in isolation without charge for 117 days under the Ninety-Day Detention Law. She was the first white woman to be detained under this law. After she was detained, her home was searched by police where they found a copy of “Fighting Talk,” owning which was punishable by a minimum of one year in prison. She was originally placed at Marshall Square police station, and many of her belongings were taken. Ruth’s cell door was bolted after she had an encounter with fellow activist Hazel Goldreich.

She was often questioned about her involvement in Rivonia, but she never revealed any information to the police. Her brother Ronald was also detained, though he was released three weeks later. Ruth was later moved to the Pretoria Central Prison where she was put under much higher security. She was eventually brought back to Marshall Square in Johannesburg and released on 7 November 1963. However, she was then arrested a second time for another period of 90 days after the Minister of Justice re-sentenced activists who served their 90 days without revealing information to the police (though she only served an extra 27 days). While in prison, she performed a short-lived hunger strike. Ruth attempted suicide by consuming a bottle of pills prescribed to her to treat a stress-induced stomach ulcer, but she did not succeed in her attempt. Ruth was released from prison 4 December 1963 with no charges.

== Exile and assassination ==
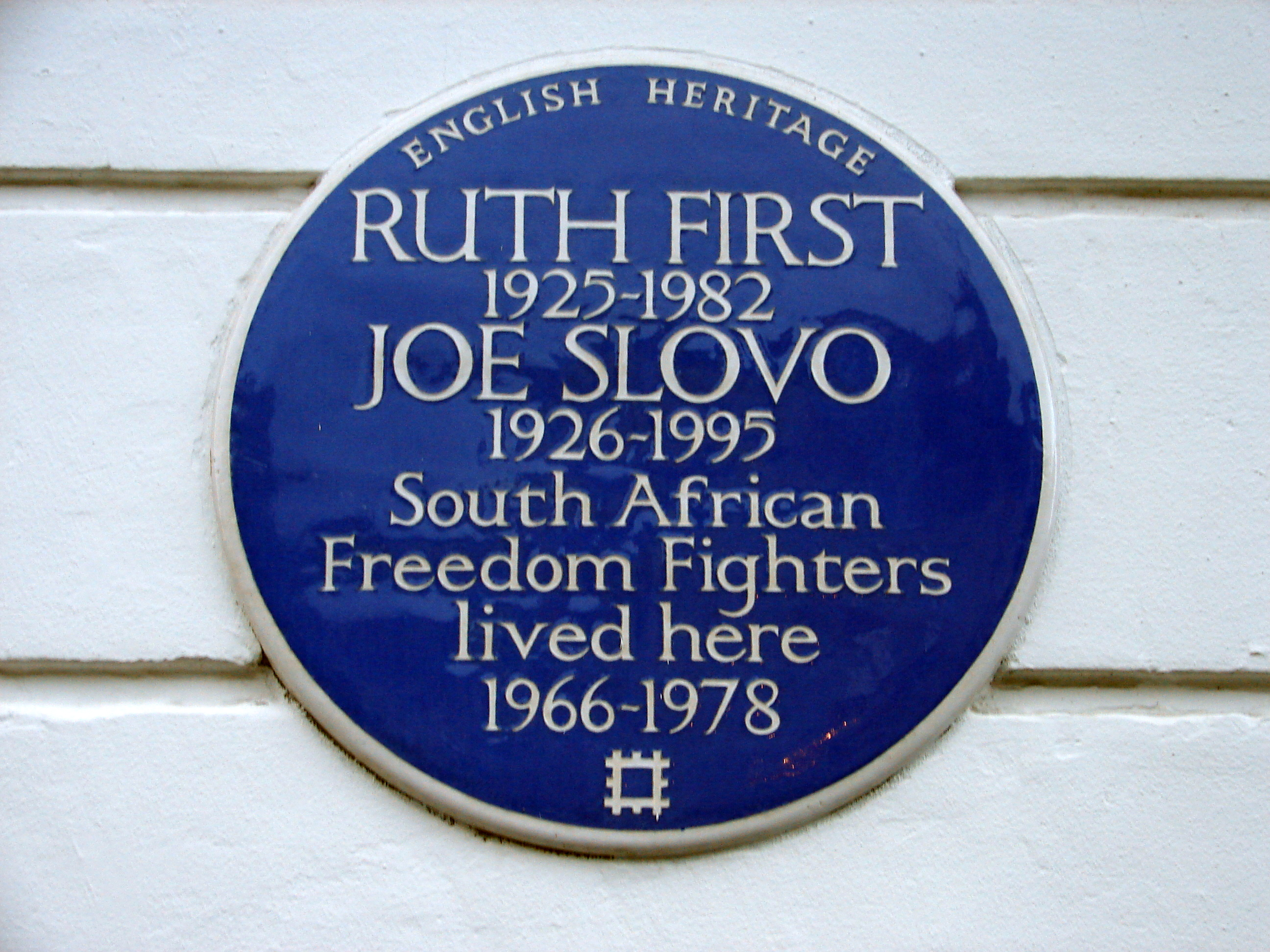
Plaque in Camden Town, London

In March 1964, First went into exile in London, where she became active in the British Anti-Apartheid Movement. Ruth edited the biographies of Nelson Mandela, Govan Mbeki, and Oginga Odinga in the late 1960s and early 1970s. She travelled across Africa between 1964 and 1968 to study independence struggles in Algeria, Egypt, Ghana, Nigeria, and Sudan. As a result, she was established as a scholar of international standing. She was a Research Fellow at the University of Manchester in 1972, and between 1973 and 1978 she lectured in development studies at the University of Durham. She also spent periods on secondment at universities in Dar es Salaam and Lourenço Marques, Maputo.

In November 1978, First took up the post of director of research at the Centre of African Studies (Centro de Estudos Africanos), Universidade Eduardo Mondlane in Maputo, Mozambique. She was assassinated by the order of Craig Williamson, a major in the South African Police, on 17 August 1982, when she opened a parcel bomb that had been sent to the university. Bridget O'Laughlin, an anthropologist working with First, was in First's office when she was murdered, and testified to the Truth and Reconciliation Commission. Presidents and ambassadors from 34 different countries were at her funeral in Maputo on 24 August 1982.

== Memoirs ==
First's book, 117 Days, is her account of her arrest, imprisonment and interrogation by the South African Police Special Branch in 1963. It was first published in 1965. The memoir provides a detailed account of how she endured "isolation and sensory deprivation" while withstanding "pressure to provide information about her comrades to the Special Branch".

Her daughter, writer Gillian Slovo, published her own memoir, Every Secret Thing: My Family, My Country, in 1997. It is an account of her childhood in South Africa and her relationship with her activist parents.

== Films ==
The film A World Apart (1988), which has a screenplay by her daughter Shawn Slovo and was directed by Chris Menges, is a biographical story about a young white girl living in South Africa with anti-apartheid activist parents, although the family is called Roth in the film. Barbara Hershey plays the character based on Ruth First.

The 2006 film Catch a Fire about the activist Patrick Chamusso was written by Shawn Slovo. First is portrayed by another daughter, Robyn Slovo, who was also one of the film's producers.

== Patrol vessel ==
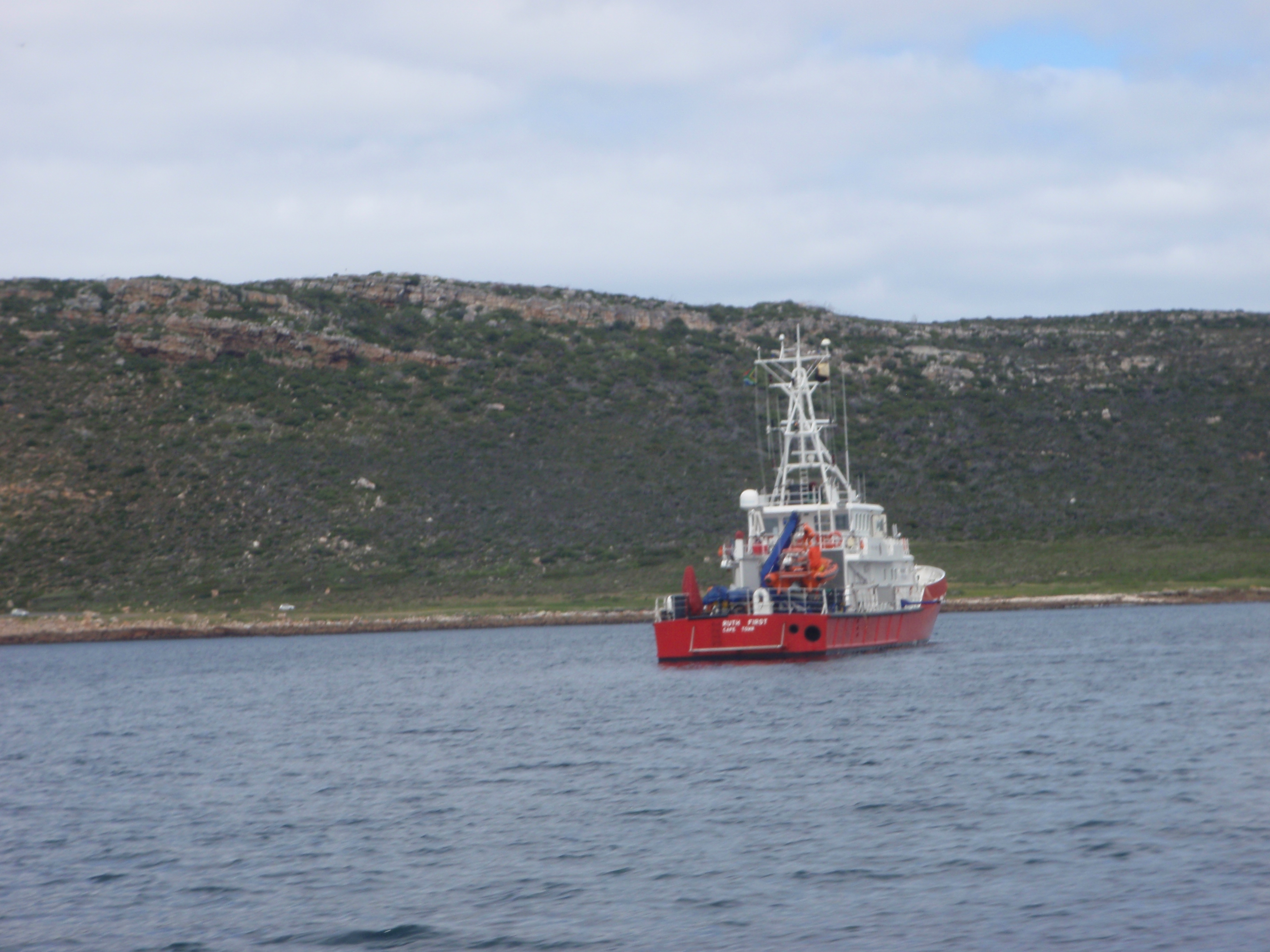
Fisheries protection vessel Ruth First at Buffels Bay.

In 2005, the South African Department of Environmental Affairs launched an environmental patrol vessel named Ruth First.

In March 2011, The Gambia issued a postage stamp in First's honour, naming her as one of the Legendary Heroes of Africa.

== Other recognitions ==
Ruth Firststraat is a street in a residential area of the city of Heerlen in the Netherlands which is named after her.

Since 2000, the University of Witwatersrand has awarded students The Ruth First Fellowship. An award that allows Fellows to pursue an in-depth project of original research that influences thinking, discussion and debate in South Africa.

In 2024, at the South African Jewish Board of Deputies' 120th anniversary gala dinner, she was honoured among 100 remarkable Jewish South Africans who have contributed to South Africa. The ceremony included speeches from Chief Rabbi Ephraim Mirvis, and First was honoured with other anti-apartheid activists, Helen Suzman, Rusty Bernstein, Arthur Goldreich and Joe Slovo.

In May 2026, the African Estudies Center (CEA) of the Eduardo Mondlane´s University in Maputo (Mozambique) dedicated a room for the memorial of Ruth First. It consisted of transforming office number 62 at the CEA, where the South African activist worked as a research director for five years and was assassinated in the same space via a letter bomb.

== Main published works ==
- South West Africa. London. 1963.
- 117 Days. London. 1965.
- (with R. Segal), South West Africa: A Travesty of Trust. London. 1967.
- The Barrel of a Gun: Political Power in Africa and the Coup d'etat in Africa. London. 1970.
- (co-edited with J. Steele and C. Gurney), The South African Connection: Western Investment in Apartheid. London. 1972.
- Libya: The Elusive Revolution. London. 1970.
- (with Ann Scott), Olive Schreiner. London: Andre Deutsch. 1980.
- The Mozambican Miner: Proletarian and Peasant. New York. 1983.

== See also ==
- List of people subject to banning orders under apartheid
- Marion Sparg - female ANC guerilla sentenced to 25 years in prison for treason
- Gert Sibande
- South African potato boycott
