= Ann Scott (British author) =

British feminist author (born 1950)

Ann Scott (born 1950) is a British feminist author born in London to an American father and British mother.

== Education and career ==
She studied at Girton College, Cambridge and was News Editor of Spare Rib before working on Schreiner. She then taught psychoanalysis at London University and published in Feminist Review and History Workshop Journal. She worked with Ruth First, with whom she co-authored a 1980 book on Olive Schreiner (published by Deutsch, ISBN 9780233971520).

She worked for Free Association Books until she moved to the US in 1989.
