= Robyn Slovo =

British film producer

- Born: 1953 (age 72–73)
- Citizenship: United Kingdom, South Africa
- Occupation: Film producer

Robyn Slovo is a South African film producer, based in the UK, whose films include Morvern Callar (2000), Catch a Fire (2006), and Tinker, Tailor, Soldier, Spy (2011).

== Early life ==
Slovo's family is Jewish. She is the daughter of Joe Slovo and Ruth First — both major figures in the anti-apartheid struggle who lived perilous lives of exile, armed resistance, and occasional imprisonment, culminating in her mother's assassination in 1982. A family memoir in the form of a feature film, A World Apart, was written by her sister Shawn Slovo and starred Barbara Hershey. She played her mother in the film Catch a Fire, also written by her sister Shawn Slovo. She is the youngest sister of novelist Gillian Slovo and screenwriter Shawn Slovo.

== Career ==
Slovo started her career in theatre, before moving into the television and film industry, working first as a script editor and development executive for the BBC, and then as a film producer for Company Pictures and Working Title Films.
