= Catch a Fire (film) =

- Theatrical release poster
- Directed by: Phillip Noyce
- Written by: Shawn Slovo
- Produced by: Tim Bevan; Eric Fellner; Anthony Minghella; Robyn Slovo
- Starring: Tim Robbins; Derek Luke; Bonnie Henna
- Cinematography: Ron Fortunato; Garry Phillips
- Edited by: Jill Bilcock
- Music by: Philip Miller
- Production companies: StudioCanal; Working Title Films; Mirage Enterprises
- Distributed by: Focus Features (United States); StudioCanal (France); Universal Pictures (International)
- Release dates: 27 October 2006 (US); 23 March 2007 (UK)
- Running time: 101 minutes
- Countries: United Kingdom; United States; France; South Africa
- Language: English
- Budget: $14 million
- Box office: $5.7 million

Catch a Fire is a 2006 biographical thriller film about anti-apartheid activists in South Africa. The film was directed by Phillip Noyce and written by Shawn Slovo. Slovo's father, Joe Slovo, and mother Ruth First, leaders of the South African Communist Party and activists in the Anti-Apartheid Movement, appear as characters in the film, while her sister, Robyn Slovo, is one of the film's producers and also plays their mother Ruth First. Catch a Fire was filmed on location in South Africa, Eswatini and Mozambique.

== Plot ==
In South Africa in 1980, Patrick Chamusso, a young, apolitical man, is accused of carrying out a terrorist bombing. Afrikaner police officer Nic Vos is in charge of locating the perpetrators of a recent terrorist attack against the Secunda CTL synthetic fuel refinery, which is the largest coal liquefaction plant in the world.

Patrick is unwillingly swept into Vos's investigation due to his inability to provide a satisfactory explanation for his whereabouts at the time of the bombing (he was actually having an affair with a woman not his wife). Eventually Patrick, his wife, Precious, and his family are tortured by Vos and his subordinates. Desperate, Patrick says that he is willing to confess to a crime he did not commit to protect his family. Vos concludes that Patrick is innocent, and orders his release.

Fuelled by the anger at the injustices he and his family suffered, Patrick joins Umkhonto we Sizwe, the military wing of the ANC (the African National Congress, one of South Africa's anti-apartheid movements) and becomes exactly what Vos had initially accused him of being. He attempts to execute a plan to attack Secunda, the oil refinery he used to work for, by first bombing its adjacent water supply facilities, and 15 minutes later triggering the main explosion within the refinery itself. This would allow the refinery's workforce to flee between the two explosions, and not be harmed. Also, the damage of the first bomb would reduce the possibility of successfully extinguishing the fire caused by the second, main explosion. Patrick succeeds in the first part, but the second bomb is discovered by Vos and deactivated.

Patrick is arrested and sentenced to 24 years in prison, after his wife goes to Vos and tells him where Patrick is, because she fell for a simple trick in which Vos left photographs of Patrick talking to a female member of the ANC. Due to her unjustified jealousy, she sells him out. He is released early due to the abolition of apartheid.

Precious, who has remarried, is waiting for him and apologizes, and Patrick forgives her and says he is sorry as well. Some time later, he sees Vos sitting out near a small body of water. He creeps over and sees that it is indeed Vos, and though a part of him wants to break Vos' neck, he decides that it is not worth it. He left Vos alone, and went on to remarry and take in over 80 orphaned children in South Africa to provide a home for kids who lost their families during the anti-apartheid struggle.

== Cast ==
- Derek Luke as Patrick Chamusso
- Tim Robbins as Nic Vos
- Bonnie Henna as Precious Chamusso
- Mncedisi Shabangu as Zeko September
- Tumisho Masha as Obadi
- Sithembiso Khumalo as Sixpence
- Terry Pheto as Miriam
- Marius Weyers as the Field Commander
- Michele Burgers as Anna Vos
- Mpho Lovinga as Johnny Piliso
- Malcolm Purkey as Joe Slovo
- Robyn Slovo as Ruth First
- Patrick Chamusso as himself
- Sibusiso Mhlongo as a Photographer
- Ziizi Mahlati as Albertina Chamusso
- Bubu Mazibuko as Betsy

== Critical reception ==
The film received positive reviews from critics. Review aggregator Rotten Tomatoes reports that 75% out of 146 professional critics gave the film a positive review, with a rating average of 6.6/10 and the critical consensus being: "No stranger to the political thriller, director Phillip Noyce tackles apartheid and terrorism with experienced gusto, while Derek Luke and Tim Robbins hand in nuanced performances."
