= Ice Road (novel) =

Novel by Gillian Slovo

- First edition
- Author: Gillian Slovo
- Language: English
- Genre: historical fiction
- Publisher: Little, Brown
- Publication date: 2004
- Publication place: UK
- Media type: Print, (audio-CD)
- Pages: 560 pp
- ISBN: 978-1844080595

Ice Road is a novel written by South African-born Gillian Slovo. It was shortlisted for the Orange Prize for Fiction. Set in Leningrad in the 1930s, the story about power in Stalinist Russia is narrated by Irina Davydovna, a cleaning lady.
