= Janusz Waluś =

Polish convicted murderer (born 1953)

- Born: Janusz Jakub Waluś; 14 January 1953 (age 73); Zakopane, Kraków Voivodeship, Polish People's Republic
- Citizenship: Polish; South African (1986–2017)
- Known for: Assassination of Chris Hani
- Status: Paroled
- Conviction: Murder
- Penalty: Death; commuted to life imprisonment

Janusz Jakub Waluś (/ˈjɑːnəs ˈwɒləs/ YAH-nəs WOL-əs, Polish: [ˈjanuʂ ˈjakub ˈvaluɕ]; born 14 January 1953) is a Polish political assassin who was convicted of the 1993 assassination of Chris Hani, General Secretary of the South African Communist Party (SACP) and chief of staff of uMkhonto weSizwe (MK), the armed wing of the African National Congress (ANC). He held dual Polish and South African citizenship from 1986 until his South African citizenship was revoked in 2017.

Initially sentenced to death for Hani's murder, Waluś's sentence was commuted to life imprisonment after capital punishment in South Africa was ruled unconstitutional in 1995, and he was held at C-Max in Pretoria. Waluś was refused parole four times, before the Constitutional Court ordered his release on parole in November 2022. In 2024, he returned to Poland.

== Early life ==
Waluś was born in Zakopane in the Polish People's Republic. He passed matura in August Witkowski 5th High School in Kraków. In 1981, he emigrated to South Africa to join his father and brother, who had arrived in South Africa in the 1970s and established a small glass factory. After the family business went bankrupt some years later, Waluś, then a truck driver, joined both the National Party and the Afrikaner Weerstandsbeweging, becoming more and more involved in the far-right politics supporting South Africa's apartheid government.

== Assassination of Chris Hani ==
The assassination of Hani took place on Easter Saturday, 10 April 1993, a time when negotiations to end apartheid were taking place. Waluś drove to Hani's house in Boksburg, Johannesburg, around 10:20 a.m. Hani had just returned home and, as he got out of his car, Waluś called out his name, at which Hani turned around and was shot once in the body and then three times in the head. Hani died on the scene, while Waluś fled. A neighbour noted the registration of the car fleeing the scene, which resulted in Waluś's capture.

Although Waluś denied any participation in the assassination, he made the mistake of assuming one of the policemen was a right-winger and exposed his own story. Thorough investigation revealed that Clive Derby-Lewis had instigated the assassination and organized the acquisition of the weapon for Waluś. The police found a hit-list that suggested Hani was the third target on Waluś's and Derby-Lewis's list, which also included the names and addresses of Nelson Mandela and Joe Slovo, among others.

== Sentencing and parole hearings ==
Waluś and Derby-Lewis were sentenced to death for their actions, but after the abolition of the death penalty in South Africa their sentence was commuted to life imprisonment. With the introduction of the Truth and Reconciliation Commission after apartheid, Waluś applied for amnesty, which would give him parole. After extensive investigation the commission found that he and Derby-Lewis were not acting on higher orders and refused amnesty; he remained in prison. Clive Derby-Lewis was released from prison on medical parole in June 2015 after serving 22 years; he died on November 3, 2016, from lung cancer.

On 10 March 2016, the High Court in Pretoria ruled that Waluś should be released on parole. The Department of Home Affairs indicated in September 2016 that Waluś would be stripped of his South African citizenship and deported back to Poland if he was released on parole.

In May 2017, Justice Minister Michael Masutha introduced an application to the Supreme Court of Appeal in Bloemfontein to overturn Waluś's parole. Meeting on 29 May, the court reserved judgment in the case, citing a procedural irregularity involving the Hani family's victim impact statement. During the hearing, Waluś's advocate, Roelof du Plessis, stated that his client's South African citizenship had been revoked by the Department of Home Affairs "just a few weeks" earlier, and that a warrant for his deportation had been issued. On 18 August 2017, the Supreme Court of Appeal overturned Waluś's parole, a decision that was welcomed by the SACP.

On 16 March 2020, Waluś was again denied parole by Justice Minister Ronald Lamola. Waluś appealed the decision to the Constitutional Court in Johannesburg. In his filing, he claimed remorse for Hani's murder and recognized apartheid had failed. Hani's widow Limpho continued to oppose his release, believing his admission of remorse to be insincere, and pointing out that other convicted assassins (such as James Earl Ray, the accused murderer of Martin Luther King Jr.) spent the rest of their lives in prison. In November 2022, the Constitutional Court ruled in favour of Waluś's appeal against these decisions and ordered his parole. Limpho Hani condemned the court's decision as "diabolical". Initially scheduled for release on 1 December, he was stabbed and wounded in jail on 29 November, and his parole delayed while he recovered. On 7 December 2022, Waluś was discharged from the hospital and officially released on parole under "strict conditions". His parole period lasted for two years, during which time he was barred from leaving South Africa. His parole ended in November 2024. The government announced that Waluś was to be deported to Poland on 6 December, with the Polish government paying for his return. Finally, on 7 December 2024, Waluś arrived in Poland, accompanied by Grzegorz Braun during the flight.

== Aftermath ==
Waluś has been used as a symbol by the far right in Poland due to his opposition to dismantling apartheid and communism in South Africa. Some Polish football fans extremist organisations have displayed banners and scarves with Waluś's name and photo, amid calls for his release from prison. In 2018, a Polish journalist who spoke to Waluś reported that "in 1993, there was a war in South Africa and he felt like a soldier ... He still believes in the system of racial segregation and that whites and blacks should live apart."

In April 2025, the Never Again Association published a report on the glorification of Waluś by the Polish far-right. It documented declarations of support for Waluś and his racist murder made by far-right activists, football fans, members of Parliament, celebrities and other figures.

== Cultural references ==
In 2019, a book Nic osobistego. Sprawa Janusza Walusia by Cezary Łazarewicz was published.

== See also ==
- List of Poles
- Anti-communism
- Neo-nazism
