= Chris Hani =

South African revolutionary and anti-apartheid activist (1942–1993)

Chris Hani SSA SBS CLS DMG MMS

11th General Secretary of the South African Communist Party
- In office 1991–1993
- Preceded by: Joe Slovo
- Succeeded by: Charles Nqakula

Chief of Staff of Umkhonto we Sizwe
- In office 1987–1992
- President: Oliver Tambo; Nelson Mandela
- Preceded by: Joe Slovo; Keith Mokoape (acting)
- Succeeded by: Siphiwe Nyanda

Personal details
- Born: Martin Thembisile Hani; 28 June 1942 Sabalele Village, Cofimvaba, South Africa
- Died: 10 April 1993 (aged 50) Boksburg, South Africa
- Cause of death: Assassination
- Party: South African Communist Party
- Other political affiliations: African National Congress (Tripartite Alliance)
- Spouse: Limpho Hani (m. 1973)
- Children: Lindiwe Hani Neo Hani Nomakwhezi Hani
- Occupation: Revolutionary; politician; military veteran; activist
- Civilian awards: Star of South Africa SSAG
- Nickname: Chris

Military service
- Allegiance: Umkhonto We Sizwe; Soviet Union (1963); Zambia (1967)
- Branch/service: Zimbabwe People's Revolutionary Army
- Years of service: 1962–1992
- Rank: Commander; Political commissar (1967)
- Battles/wars: Rhodesian Bush War
- Military awards: Star for Bravery SBS Conspicuous Leadership Star CLS Decoration for Merit DMG Merit Medal MMS Service Medal

Chris Hani (28 June 1942 – 10 April 1993; born Martin Thembisile Hani SSA, SBS, CLS, DMG, MMS) was a South African military commander, politician and revolutionary. He served as the leader of the South African Communist Party (SACP) and chief of staff of uMkhonto we Sizwe (MK), the former armed wing of the African National Congress (ANC). He was a fierce opponent of apartheid, and was assassinated by Janusz Waluś, a Polish immigrant and sympathiser of the Conservative opposition on 10 April 1993, during the unrest preceding the transition to democracy.

== Early life and education ==
Martin Thembisile Hani was born on 28 June 1942 in the Xhosa village in Cofimvaba, Transkei. His father, Gilbert Hani, was a mine union worker and political activist who left the country to go into exile in 1962 and returned to South Africa in 1991. His mother, Mary Hani, had never attended school. Chris was the fifth of six children.

He attended Lovedale school in 1957, to finish his last two years. He twice finished two school grades in a single year. When Hani was 12 years old, after hearing his father's explanations about apartheid and the African National Congress (ANC), he wished to join the ANC but was still too young to be accepted. In Lovedale school, Hani joined the ANC Youth League when he was 15 years old, even though political activities were not allowed at black schools under apartheid. He influenced other students to join the ANC. Hani was first involved with the Unity movement, before being influenced to align with the ANC due to the activism of the party concerning mass struggles. Writers such as Govan Mbeki played a critical role in his political conversion.

In 1959, at the University of Fort Hare in Alice, Eastern Cape, Hani studied English, Latin, and modern and classical literature. He was also a graduate of Rhodes University.

== Political and military career ==
At the age of 15, he joined the ANC Youth League. As a student, he was active in protests against the Bantu Education Act. He worked as a clerk for a law firm. In 1961, Hani joined a communist party led by Comrade Mbeki where he first started learning and reading about Marxism. Following his graduation, Hani joined Umkhonto we Sizwe (MK), the armed wing of the ANC. He credited his commitment to the MK as a result of his exposure to the extreme side of apartheid during his upbringing. Hani said, "I didn't get involved with the workers' struggle out of theory alone. It was a combination of theory and my own class background." Following his arrest under the Suppression of Communism Act, he went into exile in Lesotho in 1963. Because of Hani's involvement with Umkhonto we Sizwe, he was forced into hiding by the South African government and changed his first name to Chris.

He received military training in the Soviet Union and served in campaigns in the Zimbabwean War of Liberation, also called the Rhodesian Bush War. They were joint operations between Umkhonto we Sizwe (MK) and the Zimbabwe People's Revolutionary Army in the late 1960s. The Luthuli Detachment operation consolidated Hani's reputation as a soldier in the black army that took the field against apartheid and its allies. His role as a fighter from the earliest days of MK's exile (following the arrest of Nelson Mandela and the other internal MK leaders at Rivonia) was an important part in the fierce loyalty that Hani later enjoyed in some quarters as MK's Deputy Commander (Joe Modise was overall commander). In 1969, Hani co-signed, with six others, the "Hani Memorandum", which was strongly critical of the leadership of Joe Modise, Moses Kotane and other comrades in the leadership. This memorandum was also a cry to radicalize the anti-apartheid movement in the ANC. Hani saw the overreliance on diplomatic negotiations as inefficient and was critical of the separation between the leaders of the ANC and the fighters of the MK. Hani stressed the fact in the memorandum by saying, "the ANC is the vanguard of the revolutionary struggle in South Africa and it is strange that its leaders have not been obliged to take the M.K. oath". Hani and the signatories of the memorandum aimed to unite both parties while also holding leaders of the ANC accountable for complacency.

In Lesotho, Hani organised guerrilla operations of the MK in South Africa. By 1982, he had become prominent enough to have become the target of assassination attempts, and he eventually moved to the ANC's headquarters in Lusaka, Zambia. As head of Umkhonto we Sizwe, he was responsible for the suppression of a mutiny by dissident anti-Communist ANC members in detention camps, but denied any role in abuses including torture and murder. Many MK female operatives, such as Dipuo Mvelase, adored Chris Hani for having protected women's rights and caring about their wellbeing at military camps.

Having spent time as a clandestine organiser in South Africa in the mid-1970s, he permanently returned to South Africa following the unbanning of the ANC in 1990, and took over from Joe Slovo as head of the South African Communist Party (SACP) on 8 December 1991. He supported the suspension of the ANC's armed struggle in favour of negotiations, as well as the inclusion of a multi-party political system. Hani also pushed for radical economic reform in South Africa. He put great effort into advocating for a socialist economy. Social redistribution as well as protecting labor rights were central in Hani's push to improve the South African economy post apartheid. In an interview in 1993, Hani explained how creating a socio economic restructure would be a massive job for South Africans.

== Assassination ==
Chris Hani was assassinated on 10 April 1993 outside his home in Dawn Park, a racially mixed suburb of Boksburg. He was accosted by a Polish far-right anti-communist immigrant named Janusz Waluś, who shot him as he stepped out of his car. Waluś fled the scene but was soon arrested after Margareta Harmse, a white Afrikaner housewife, saw Waluś straight after the crime as she was driving past, and called the police. A neighbour of Hani also witnessed the crime and later identified both Waluś and the vehicle he was driving at the time. Clive Derby-Lewis, a senior South African Conservative Party MP and Shadow Minister for Economic Affairs at the time, who had lent Waluś his pistol, was also arrested for complicity in Hani's murder. The Conservative Party of South Africa had broken away from the ruling National Party out of opposition to the reforms of P. W. Botha. After the elections of 1989, it was the second-strongest party in the House of Assembly, behind the National Party, and opposed F. W. de Klerk's dismantling of apartheid.

Historically, the assassination is seen as a turning point. Serious tensions followed the assassination, with fears that the country would erupt in violence. Nelson Mandela addressed the nation appealing for calm, in a speech regarded as presidential even though he was not yet president of the country:

Tonight I am reaching out to every single South African, black and white, from the very depths of my being. A white man, full of prejudice and hate, came to our country and committed a deed so foul that our whole nation now teeters on the brink of disaster. A white woman, of Afrikaner origin, risked her life so that we may know, and bring to justice, this assassin. The cold-blooded murder of Chris Hani has sent shock waves throughout the country and the world. ... Now is the time for all South Africans to stand together against those who, from any quarter, wish to destroy what Chris Hani gave his life for – the freedom of all of us.

While riots followed the assassination, both sides of the negotiation process were galvanised into action, and they soon agreed that the democratic elections should take place on 27 April 1994, just over a year after Hani's assassination.

=== Assassins' conviction and amnesty hearing ===
In October 1993, both Janusz Waluś and Clive Derby-Lewis were convicted for the murder and sentenced to death. Derby-Lewis's wife, Gaye, was acquitted. Both men's sentences were commuted to life imprisonment when the death penalty was abolished as a result of a Constitutional Court ruling in 1995.

Hani's killers appeared before the Truth and Reconciliation Commission, claiming political motivation for their crimes and applying for amnesty on the basis that they had acted on the orders of the Conservative Party. The Hani family was represented by the anti-apartheid lawyer George Bizos. Their applications were denied when the TRC ruled that they had not acted under orders. Following several failed attempts, Derby-Lewis was granted medical parole in May 2015 after he had been diagnosed with terminal lung cancer; he died 18 months later, on 3 November 2016.

On 10 March 2016, the north Gauteng High Court ordered Waluś to be released on parole under bail conditions. The Department of Justice and Correctional Services lodged an appeal against the parole decision to the Supreme Court of Appeal in Bloemfontein. The Department of Home Affairs has indicated that Waluś may have his South African citizenship revoked. On 18 August 2017, the Supreme Court of Appeal in Bloemfontein overturned Waluś's parole, a decision that was welcomed by the SACP. By October 2019, Waluś was still in prison, despite his lawyer's claim that he is completely rehabilitated. On 16 March 2020, Waluś was again denied parole by Justice Minister Ronald Lamola. On 7 December 2022, Waluś was granted parole under strict conditions by Justice Minister Ronald Lamola. In 2024, the government announced that Waluś was to be deported to Poland on 6 December, with the Polish Government paying for the proceedings. Waluś arrived in Poland on 7 December 2024.

=== Conspiracy theories ===
Hani's assassination has attracted numerous conspiracy theories about outside involvement. The final report of the Truth and Reconciliation Commission said it "was unable to find evidence that the two murderers convicted of the killing of Chris Hani took orders from international groups, security forces or from higher up in the right-wing echelons".

=== Consequences ===
His assassination threatened to plundge the country into chaos. His death brought forth protests throughout the country and across the international community, but ultimately proved a turning point in the negotiations to end Apartheid, after which the main parties pushed for a settlement with increased determination.

== Influence ==
Hani was a charismatic leader, with significant support among the radical anti-apartheid youth. At the time of his death, he was the most popular ANC leader after his senior, Nelson Mandela. Hani enjoyed widespread support beyond his constituency in the SACP and ANC and had been recognised as a potential successor to Mandela. Following the legalisation of the ANC, his support for the negotiation process with the apartheid government was critical in keeping the militants in line. Despite starting off as an advocate for armed resistance, he was able to adapt to the needs of the people and moved towards peaceful political negotiations. Hani also played a critical role in deepening the alliance between the SCAP, ANC, and Congress of South African Trade Unions (COSATU). These relationships played a big role in the success of the anti-apartheid resistance movement. Chris Hani became a global figure for anti apartheid and resistance movements around the world.

In Poland, the far right has supported Waluś and praised his murder. In April 2025, the Never Again Association published a report on this phenomenon.

== Recognition and legacy ==
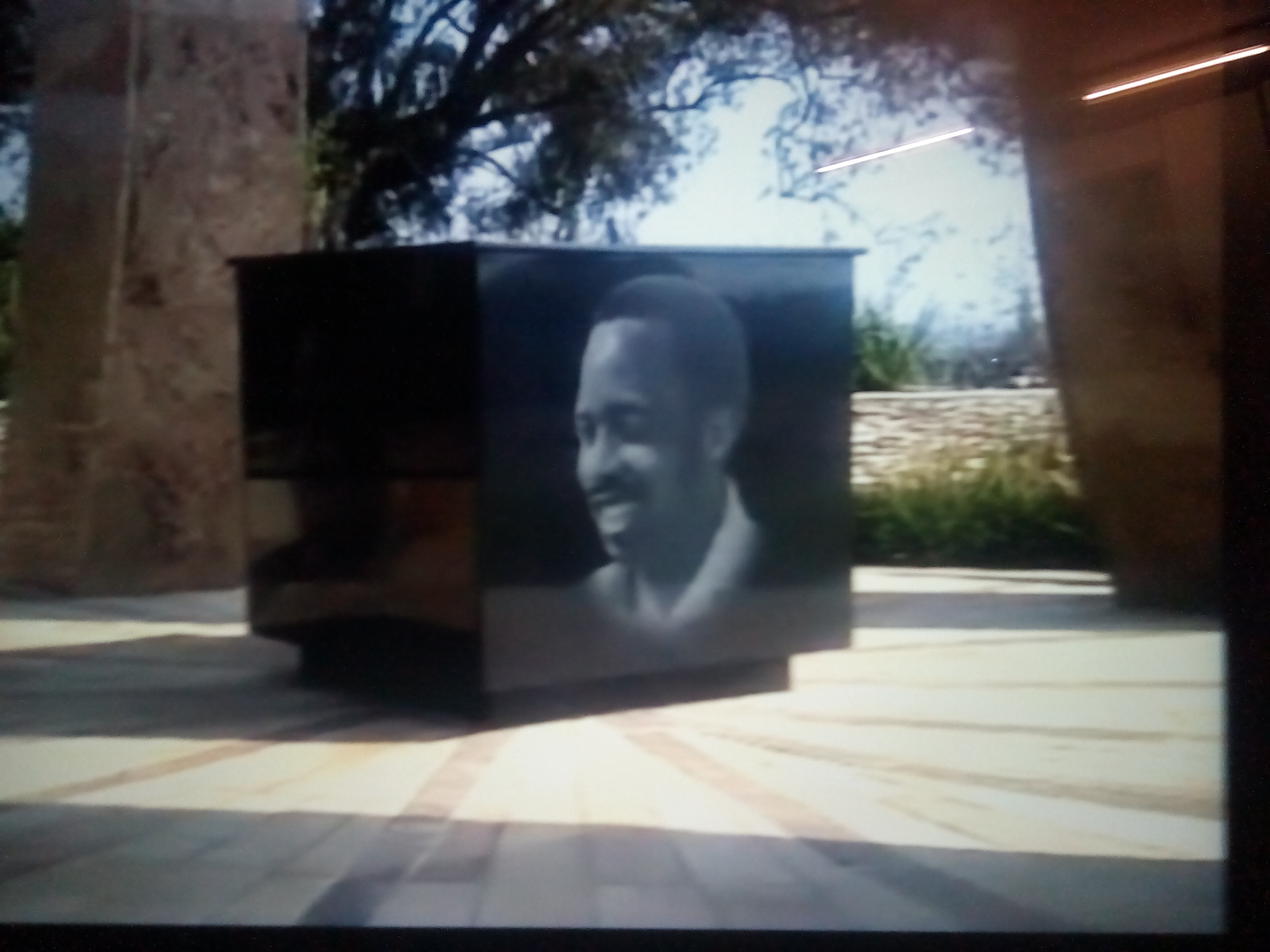
Chris Hani monument

=== Honours and awards ===
Hani was the recipient of many posthumous awards, including:

- Star of South Africa (Gold) (SSAG)
- Star for Bravery (Silver) (SBS)
- Conspicuous Leadership Star (CLS)
- Decoration for Merit (Gold) (DMG)
- Merit Medal (Silver) (MMS)
- Service Medal (Gold)
- Service Medal (Silver)
- Service Medal (Bronze)

=== Places ===
In 1997, Baragwanath Hospital, one of the largest hospitals in the world, was renamed the Chris Hani Baragwanath Hospital in his memory.

A District Municipality in the Eastern Cape was named the Chris Hani District Municipality.

The Thembisile Hani Local Municipality in Mpumalanga also bears his name.

In 2009, after the extension of Cape Town's Central Line, the new railway terminus serving eastern areas of Khayelitsha was named Chris Hani.

=== Other recognition ===
Days after his assassination, the rock group Dave Matthews Band (whose lead singer and guitarist, Dave Matthews, is from South Africa) began playing what would become "#36", with lyrics and chorus referring to Hani's shooting.

In 1993, French philosopher Jacques Derrida dedicated Spectres de Marx (1993) to Hani.

In September 2004, Hani was voted 20th in the SABC's Top 100 Greatest South Africans poll.

A short opera, Hani, by composer Bongani Ndodana-Breen with libretto by film producer Mfundi Vundla, was commissioned by Cape Town Opera and the University of Cape Town, premiering at the Baxter Theatre on 21 November 2010.

== Personal life ==
Hani married Limpho in 1974 at a magistrate's court in Lusaka, Zambia; they had a celebratory wedding lunch at Wimpy. The couple had three daughters together: Neo, Nomakhwezi, and Lindiwe. Nomakhwezi died aged 23 in 2001.

== Books ==
- Mali, Thami (1993). Thami Mali Remembers Chris Hani; The Sun That Set Before Dawn. Johannesburg: SACHED Trust. ISBN 9780868774121.

Party political offices
Preceded by Joe Slovo	General Secretary of the South African Communist Party; 1991–93	Succeeded by Charles Nqakula
