= Red Dust (2004 film) =

- DVD cover art
- Directed by: Tom Hooper
- Screenplay by: Troy Kennedy Martin
- Based on: Red Dust; 2000 novel by Gillian Slovo
- Produced by: Helena Spring; David Thompson
- Starring: Hilary Swank; Chiwetel Ejiofor
- Cinematography: Larry Smith
- Edited by: Avril Beukes
- Music by: Robert Lane
- Production companies: Videovision Entertainment; BBC Films; Distant Horizon
- Distributed by: Verve Pictures
- Release date: 13 September 2004 (TIFF)
- Running time: 106 minutes
- Countries: United Kingdom; South Africa
- Language: English

Red Dust is a 2004 British drama film starring Hilary Swank and Chiwetel Ejiofor and directed by Tom Hooper.

The screenplay, written by Troy Kennedy Martin, is based on the novel Red Dust by Gillian Slovo. The film was predominantly shot on location in South Africa, specifically in the town of Graaff Reinet.

== Plot ==
Sarah Barcant (Hilary Swank), a white lawyer in New York City who grew up in South Africa, returns to her childhood home to represent Alex Mpondo (Chiwetel Ejiofor), a Black South African politician who was tortured during apartheid. Under the post-apartheid Truth and Reconciliation terms, the whole truth must come out. As it is, under duress Mpondo had identified one of his underground comrades, Steve Sizela, to the apartheid authorities. But he also confirms that he kept a much more important secret – a list of new recruits. This is still where he left it buried.

The full truth now emerges. Dirk Hendricks (Jamie Bartlett), the local policeman, admits Sizela was killed by his boss, Piet Muller (Ian Roberts) and that much of the torture was carried out at a ranch rather than at the police station – thus confirming Alex's apparently false memories of a 'dirt floor' and a water tap in the corridor. Visiting the ranch, Alex puts details together. Dirk admits where he buried Steve Sizela. The bones are found and dug from the ground; Mpondo decides to allow amnesty as the whole truth has been said. Muller, who denied the charges and pleaded not guilty, ironically applies for amnesty himself, infuriating members of the Black South African community.

Parallel with this story is Barcant's confrontation with her own past. She was arrested as a teenager for having a black boyfriend, which was breaking the apartheid laws. She got out of custody after one night, thanks to Ben Hoffman, a white lawyer who has worked all of his life against apartheid and is a strong believer in 'Truth and Reconciliation'. Sarah Barcant is there because she owes him a debt, and he is now too weak to take the case himself. He sees the outcome as positive.

== Cast ==
- Hilary Swank as Sarah Barcant
- Chiwetel Ejiofor as Alex Mpondo
- Jamie Bartlett as Dirk Hendricks
- Ian Roberts as Piet Müller
- Nomhle Nkonyeni as Mrs. Sizela
- Marius Weyers as Ben Hoffman
