= Patrick Chamusso =

South African activist

- Born: 1949 (age 76–77); Mozambique
- Political party: African National Congress

Patrick Chamusso (born in 1949 in Mozambique) is a member of the African National Congress (ANC) party of South Africa who participated in the militant actions of the organization during the apartheid era.

== Biography ==
One of three sons, Patrick came to live in South Africa when as a teenager he followed his migrant worker father to work in the mines of South Africa performing odd jobs. After his father's death, Chamusso's mother remarried and bore a daughter. He had various jobs on the mines and later worked as a house painter and street photographer.

When he was 28, he got a job at the Sasol synthetic fuel plant at Secunda (Secunda CTL), the largest coal liquefaction plant in the world, located several hours east of Johannesburg. Although not formally educated, he advanced quickly and ended up as a driver, a position that was well-paid. His main job was to fetch coal from a neighbouring mine and bring it into the refinery. A talented football player who had formerly played for local leagues, his abilities later made him popular among his co-workers and in the community.

Chamusso was arrested in 1980 by South African Special Branch for conspiring with the ANC to bomb the Secunda refinery, a crime he insisted he did not commit. He was later released without charges being laid. He reported that he had been tortured whilst a prisoner. He fled to Mozambique where he joined Umkhonto we Sizwe, the paramilitary wing of the ANC.

After military training, he returned to South Africa where he single-handedly carried out a second, partly successful, bombing at Secunda, which, as was intended, resulted in no casualties. After a massive manhunt, he was arrested and sentenced to 24 years in prison on Robben Island. In 1994, as the apartheid system began to be dismantled, having served 10 years, Chamusso was released under the new government's amnesty policy.

After his release, Chamusso married a woman named Conney, and the couple had three children, in addition to fostering 80 AIDS orphans at their home in Mpumalanga.

Chamusso rose to world prominence in October 2006, with the release of Catch a Fire, a biographical film depicting his struggle against Apartheid.
