= Dawn Park =

- Location within Gauteng Location within South Africa
- Coordinates: 26.299°S 28.246°E
- Country: South Africa
- Province: Gauteng
- Municipality: Ekurhuleni
- Main Place: Boksburg

Area
  - Total: 4.16 km^{2} (1.61 sq mi)

Population (2011)
  - Total: 10,475
  - Density: 2,520/km^{2} (6,520/sq mi)

Racial makeup (2011)
  - Black African: 95.1%
  - Coloured: 3.4%
  - Indian/Asian: 0.5%
  - White: 0.8%
  - Other: 0.2%

First languages (2011)
  - Zulu: 33.5%
  - Sotho: 17.1%
  - English: 11.4%
  - Northern Sotho: 10.2%
  - Other: 27.7%
- Time zone: UTC+2 (SAST)
- Postal code (street): 1459
- PO box: 1474

Dawn Park is a suburb in Boksburg neighbouring Vosloorus.
