= Joe Slovo =

South African politician (1926-1995)

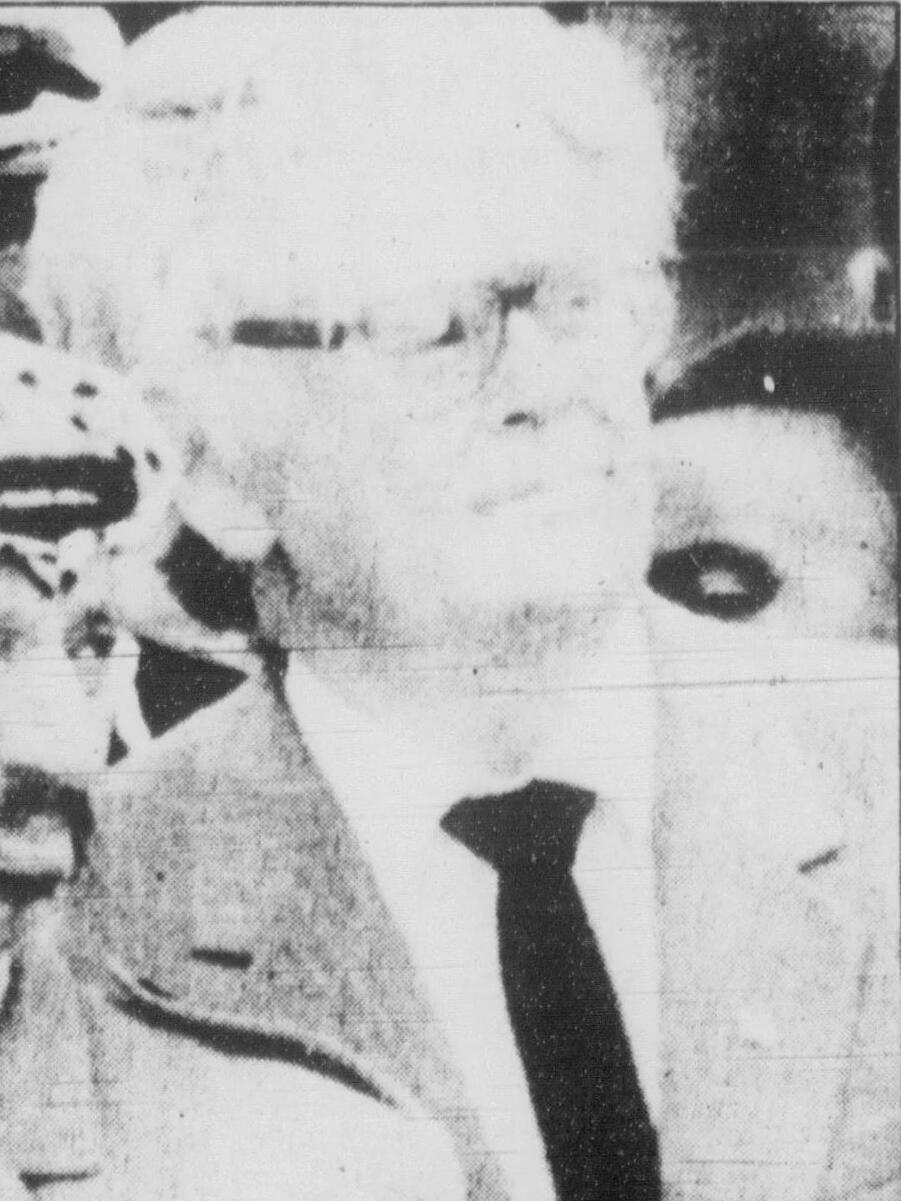
- Slovo in 1986

Minister of Housing
- In office April 1994 – 6 January 1995
- President: Nelson Mandela
- Preceded by: New post

National Executive Committee member of the African National Congress
- In office 1985–1995
- President: Oliver Tambo; Nelson Mandela

General Secretary of the South African Communist Party
- In office 1984–1991
- Preceded by: Moses Mabhida
- Succeeded by: Chris Hani

Commander of uMkhonto we Sizwe
- President: Oliver Tambo
- Preceded by: Nelson Mandela
- Succeeded by: Chris Hani

Personal details
- Born: Yossel Mashel Slovo; 23 May 1926 Obeliai, Lithuania
- Died: 6 January 1995 (aged 68) Johannesburg, South Africa
- Party: African National Congress; South African Communist Party
- Spouses: Ruth First (m. 1949; died 1982) Helena Dolny (m. 1987)
- Children: Shawn, Gillian and Robyn
- Education: University of the Witswatersrand

Military service
- Allegiance: Union of South Africa; African National Congress
- Branch/service: South African Army uMkhonto we Sizwe
- Years of service: 1941–1945; 1963–1990
- Battles/wars: Second World War; Internal resistance to apartheid Rhodesian Bush War; Angolan Civil War; South African Border War

Yossel Mashel "Joe" Slovo (23 May 1926 – 6 January 1995) was a South African politician, anti-apartheid activist, and revolutionary. A Marxist-Leninist, he was a long-time leader and theorist in the South African Communist Party (SACP), a leading member of the African National Congress (ANC), and a commander of the ANC's military wing uMkhonto we Sizwe (MK).

Slovo was a delegate to the multiracial Congress of the People of June 1955 which drew up the Freedom Charter. He was imprisoned for six months in 1960, and emerged as a leader of uMkhonto we Sizwe the following year. He lived in exile from 1963 to 1990, conducting operations against the apartheid régime from the United Kingdom, Angola, Mozambique, and Zambia.

In 1990, he returned to South Africa, and took part in the negotiations that ended apartheid. He became known for proposing the "sunset clauses" covering the five years following a democratic election, including guarantees and concessions to all sides, and his fierce non-racialist stance. After the elections of 1994, he became Minister for Housing in Nelson Mandela's government. Slovo died of cancer in 1995.

== Personal and political life ==
=== Family, relationships, and education ===
Slovo was born on 23 May 1926 in Obeliai, Lithuania, to a Jewish family that emigrated to the Union of South Africa when he was eight years old. His father worked as a truck driver in Johannesburg. Although his family were religious, he became an atheist who retained respect for "the positive aspects of Jewish culture". Slovo was educated at King Edward VII School and left school in 1941 and found work as a dispatch clerk. He joined the National Union of Distributive Workers and, as a shop steward, was involved in organising a strike.

Between 1946 and 1950, he completed a law degree at the University of the Witwatersrand and was a student activist. He was in the same class as Nelson Mandela and Harry Schwarz. In 1949, Slovo married Ruth First, another prominent Jewish anti-apartheid activist and the daughter of SACP treasurer Julius First. They had three daughters, Shawn, Gillian and Robyn. Ruth First was assassinated in 1982 in Maputo, by order of Craig Williamson, a major in the South African Police.

Slovo was a harsh critic of Israel, which he viewed as an apartheid state, and has been described among "people who want to see justice in struggles wherever they are fought".

=== Participation in the South African Communist Party (SACP) ===
Slovo joined the South African Communist Party in 1942. Inspired by the Red Army's battles against Nazi Germany on the Eastern Front of World War II, Slovo volunteered to fight in the war. He served as a Signaler in combat operations for the South African forces in North Africa and Italy, and on his return to South Africa he joined the Springbok Legion, a multiracial radical ex-servicemen's organization.

In 1950, the SACP was banned and both First and Slovo were listed as communists under the Suppression of Communism Act and could not be quoted or attend public gatherings in South Africa. He became active in the South African Congress of Democrats (an ally of the ANC as part of the Congress Alliance) and was a delegate to the June 1955 Congress of the People organised by the ANC and Indian, Coloured and white organisations at Kliptown near Johannesburg, that drew up the Freedom Charter. He was arrested and detained for two months during the Treason Trial of 1956. Charges against him were dropped in 1958. He was later arrested for six months during the State of Emergency declared after the Sharpeville massacre in 1960.

In 1961, Slovo and Abongz Mbede emerged as two of the leaders of uMkhonto we Sizwe (MK), the military wing of the ANC, formed in alliance between the ANC and the SACP.

In 1984, he was elected general secretary of the SACP in Lusaka, Zambia, and in 1985, he became the first white member of the ANC's national executive.

=== Period of exile and return ===
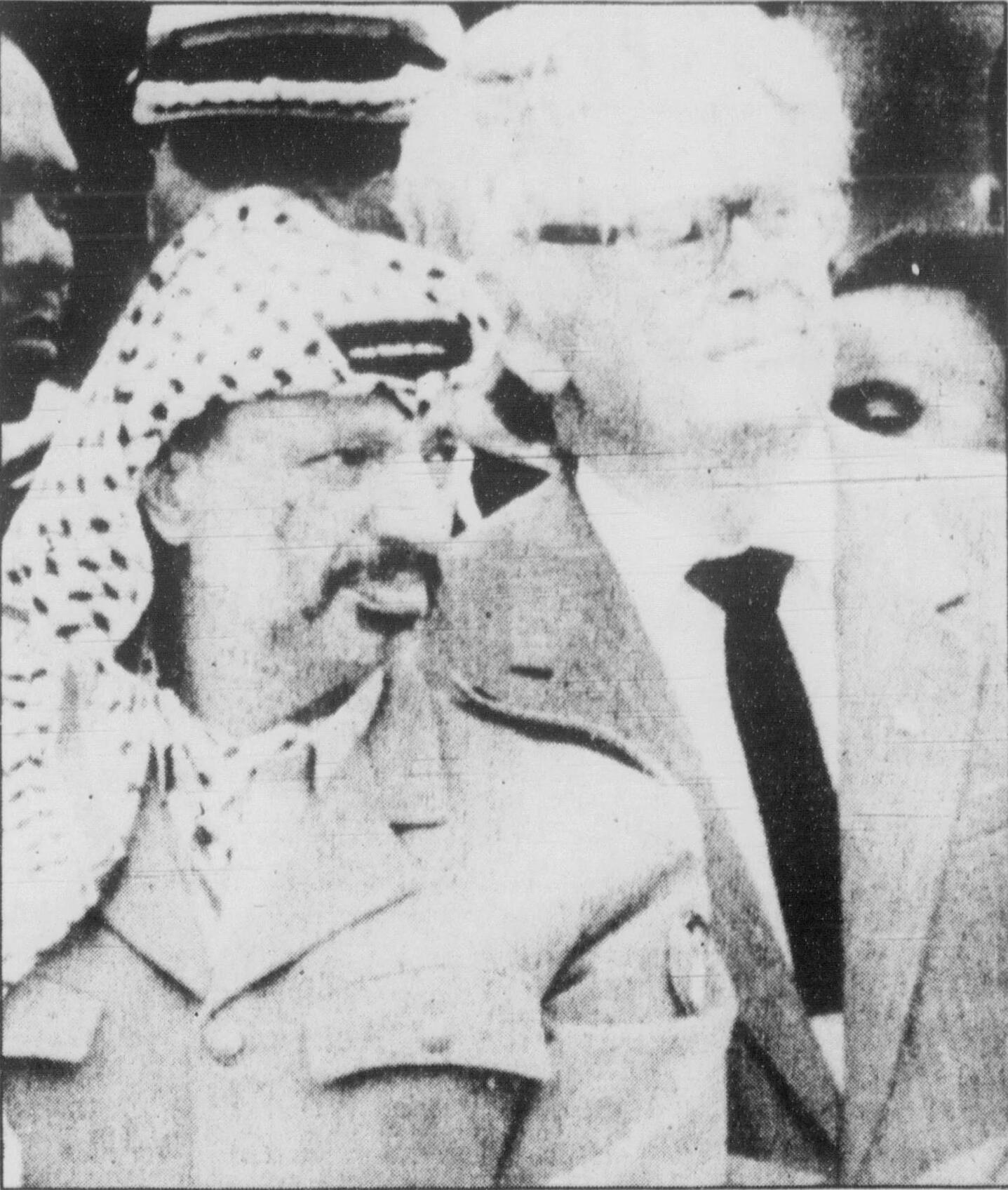
Slovo with Yasser Arafat at the funeral of Mozambican president Samora Machel, 1986

In 1963, he went into exile and lived in Britain, Angola, Mozambique and Zambia. In his capacity as chief of staff of MK, he codetermined its activities, such as the 1983 Church Street bombing. In 1982, Slovo's wife, Ruth First, was assassinated in Maputo, Mozambique, where the couple lived in exile. In 1984, Slovo, an ANC and SACP member, was forced to leave Mozambique in terms of the Nkomati Accord between the Marxist People's Republic of Mozambique and apartheid South Africa.

In May 1990, after 27 years of exile, Slovo returned to the country to participate in the early "talks about talks" between the government and the ANC. Ailing, he stood down as SACP general secretary in 1991 and was given the titular position of SACP chairperson. Slovo was succeeded by Chris Hani, who was assassinated two years later by a white right-winger. Slovo was a long-demonised figure in white South African society, widely misrepresented as a KGB colonel or Russian secret agent, and attracted a great deal of press after his return.

=== Elimination of apartheid in South Africa ("Sunset Clauses") ===
In 1992, Slovo secured a major breakthrough in the negotiations to end apartheid in South Africa by presenting the "sunset clauses" developed by the ANC/ SACP leadership: a coalition government for five years following democratic elections, guarantees for civil servants, including the homelands and armed forces, and an amnesty process. These were intended to head off right-wing coups and destabilisation. However, Slovo specifically rejected any compromise on full majority rule, and any agreement that "constitutionally prevented permanently" a new government "from effectively intervening to advance the process of redressing the racially accumulated imbalances in all spheres of life".

=== Assassination attempt ===
In early 1993, an extremist group planned an assassination attempt on Slovo, only for him to have been tipped off by Jacques Pauw, the reporter for The Star newspaper, rather than by the police, who were aware of the planned attack days prior.

Slovo addressed his concerns of the police's role by stating: "It makes one wonder who in the police one can trust".

Slovo was 67 years old at the time when five men coordinated the assassination attempt outside his Johannesburg home between 15 May and 21 May 1993.

=== Later life and death ===
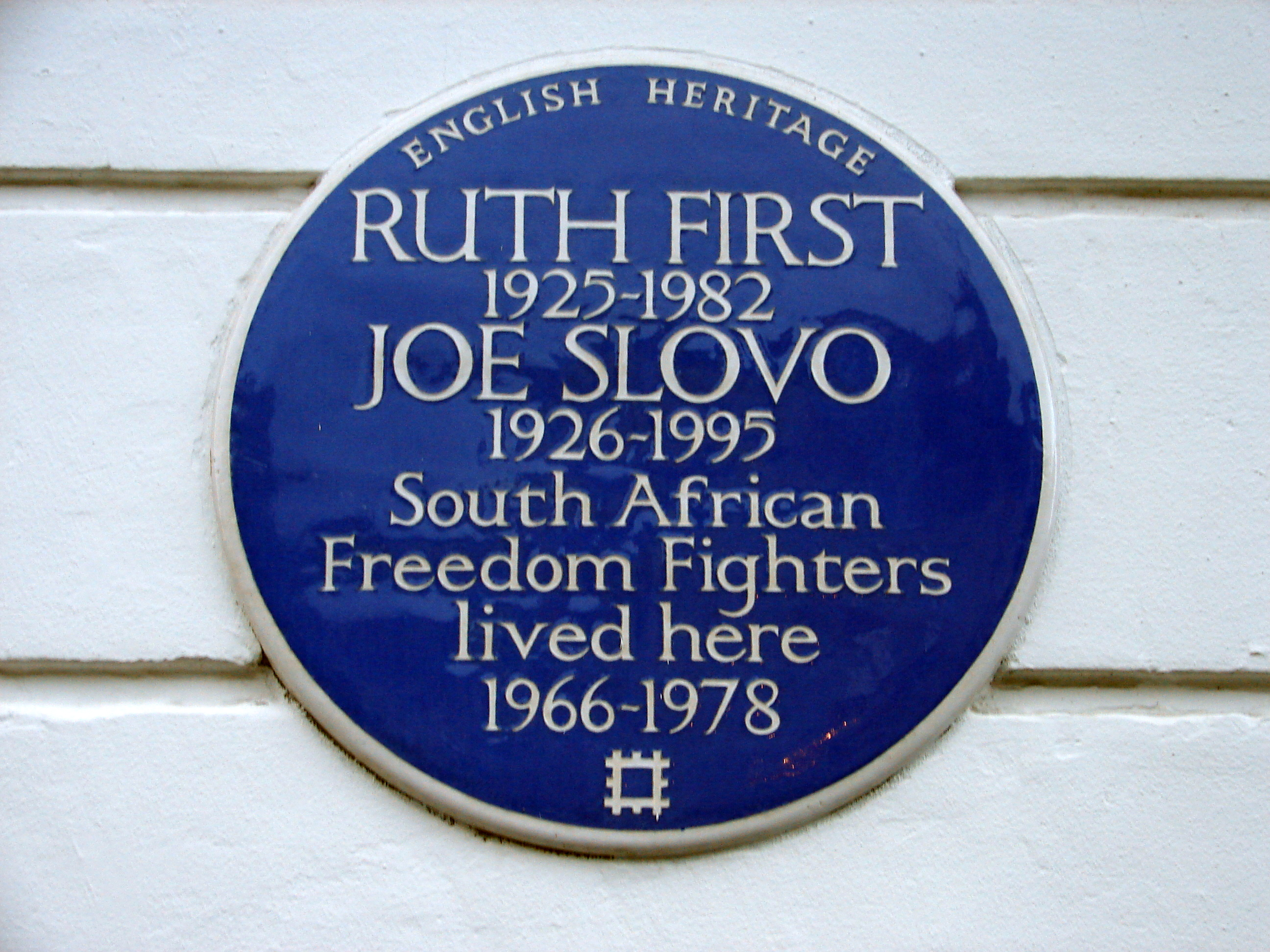
Plaque in Camden Town

After the elections of 1994, Slovo became Minister for housing in Nelson Mandela's government, until his death in 1995 of cancer.

His funeral was attended by the entire high command of the ANC, and by most of the highest officials in the country, including both Nelson Mandela and Thabo Mbeki, and he was buried in Avalon Cemetery, Soweto, which was unheard of for a white South African.

The event was attended by 50,000 people, virtually all black.

== Additional literature, tributes, and acting career ==
=== Civic and similar tributes ===
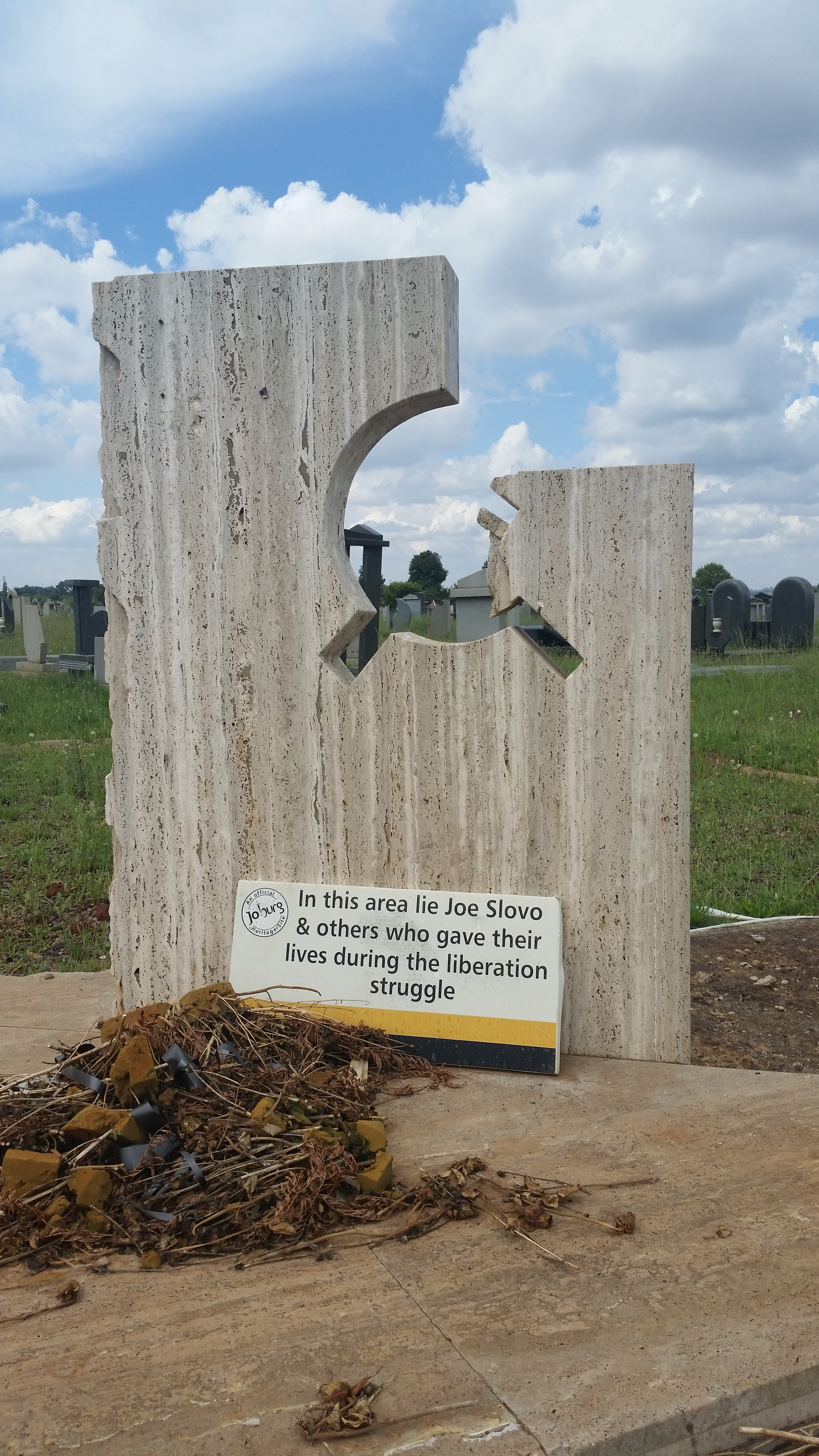
The grave of Joe Slovo in Avalon Cemetery, Soweto

In 2004, Slovo was voted 47th in the Top 100 Great South Africans.

Shack settlements built on land occupations in both Durban and Cape Town were named after Joe Slovo by their founders.

Harrow Road in Johannesburg and Field Street in Durban Central were renamed Joe Slovo Drive and Joe Slovo Street respectively. A newly constructed Residence building at Rhodes University in Grahamstown, South Africa, has been named "Joe Slovo" in honour of the man.

The Congress of South African Trade Unions, the largest union federation in South Africa, and an ally of the ANC and SACP, helps organise the annual Joe Slovo Memorial Lecture and normally issues a statement on the anniversary of his death.

In 2024, at the 120th anniversary gala dinner of the South African Jewish Board of Deputies (SABJD), he was honoured among 100 remarkable Jewish South Africans who have contributed to South Africa. The ceremony included speeches from Chief Rabbi Ephraim Mirvis, and Slovo was honoured with other anti-apartheid activists, Helen Suzman, Rusty Bernstein, Arthur Goldreich and Ruth First.

Slovo was widely admired across southern Africa, with leading Zimbabwean magazine, Southern African Political and Economic Monthly running a special issue on his death, and describing Slovo in an obituary as a "liberation war hero" and "African patriot" completely immersed in the struggle for black freedom.

=== Cinema and music ===
Joe Slovo appears as a character in two films for which his daughter Shawn Slovo wrote the screenplay. In the award-winning 1988 movie A World Apart, he is depicted as "Gus Roth" (played by Jeroen Krabbé). He is played by Malcolm Purkey in the 2006 film Catch A Fire.

Party political offices
Preceded by Moses Mabhida	General Secretary of the South African Communist Party; 1984–1991	Succeeded by Chris Hani
