= Katiza Cebekhulu =

South African whistleblower (born 1970)

- Born: Katiza Themba Cebekhulu; 12 February 1970 (age 56)
- Occupation: Former member of the Mandela United Football Club
- Known for: Mandela United Football Club
- Criminal status: Detained without trial in Zambia (1991–1997)

Katiza Themba Cebekhulu (born 12 February 1970) is a South African national known for his involvement with the Mandela United Football Club and his claims regarding the 1988 murder of Stompie Seipei. He has been living in the United Kingdom on asylum, citing fears for his safety in South Africa.

He testified in the 1991 trial of Winnie Mandela and implicated Winnie Madikizela-Mandela in Seipei’s killing, a claim that remains controversial. After this, Cebekhulu was lured to Zambia by the African National Congress (ANC) where he was imprisoned under unclear circumstances, and after his release in 1997, he sought asylum in the United Kingdom, where he currently resides. He also testified before the Truth and Reconciliation Commission (TRC) and further implicated Madikizela-Mandela in ordering several murders committed during vigilantism in Soweto in the 1980s by the Mandela United

== Early life ==
Katiza Themba Cebekhulu was born in KwaZulu-Natal, South Africa, on 12 February 1970 during a time of intense political violence between the ANC and the Inkatha Freedom Party (IFP). He grew up in poverty, and in 1988, he left his home for Johannesburg in search of a better life. However, his time in Johannesburg led him into the sphere of Winnie Madikizela-Mandela and the Mandela United Football Club, a controversial group that functioned as Madikizela-Mandela's personal security detail and engaged in Soweto vigilantism, led by Jerry Richardson.

== Involvement with the Mandela United Football Club ==
Upon arriving in Soweto, Cebekhulu became associated with the Mandela United Football Club and lived on the property of Madikizela-Mandela. According to his testimony, he witnessed several violent incidents involving the club, including the assault and abduction of young activists, like Stompie Seipei. In his testimony before the Truth and Reconciliation Commission (TRC) in 1997, Cebekhulu claimed that he saw Madikizela-Mandela personally stab Stompie Seipei in December 1988. Seipei, a 14-year-old activist, had been accused of being a police informant and was taken from the Soweto manse of Methodist minister Paul Verryn. Cebekhulu stated that he witnessed Madikizela-Mandela, alongside club "coach" Jerry Richardson and others, brutally beat Seipei before ultimately killing him. He also claimed that Seipei was accused of having inappropriate relations with a white man, which reportedly provoked Madikizela-Mandela’s wrath.

== Imprisonment in Zambia ==
Cebekhulu was expected to testify in the Winnie Mandela 1991 trial. However, Cebekhulu disappeared before he could give evidence. It was later revealed that he had been taken to Zambia by the African National Congress (ANC), where he was imprisoned without trial for several years under the rule of President Kenneth Kaunda.

British journalist Fred Bridgland and former British MP Baroness Emma Nicholson later worked to secure Cebekhulu’s release. According to Bridgland’s book Katiza’s Journey, the man's imprisonment was an orchestrated move to prevent him from testifying against Madikizela-Mandela. After pressure from international human rights activists, Cebekhulu was released and granted limited asylum in the United Kingdom in 1997.

== Controversies and allegations of unreliability ==
While Cebekhulu’s testimony played a significant role in shaping perceptions of Madikizela-Mandela’s actions during the late 1980s, it has been met with skepticism. South Africa’s National Police Commissioner, George Fivaz, told the TRC that Cebekhulu was not considered a reliable witness, stating that he had provided multiple conflicting accounts regarding the murder of Abu Baker-Asvat, a doctor who was assassinated in Soweto in 1989, allegedly after Madikizela-Mandela's instructions. Cebekhulu’s claims were vehemently dismissed by the ANC, arguing that his testimony was part of a broader effort to discredit Madikizela-Mandela.

== Life in the United Kingdom ==
After his release from Zambian prison, Cebekhulu settled in the United Kingdom. However, he faced ongoing struggles, including legal issues and financial difficulties. He was diagnosed with post-traumatic stress disorder (PTSD) and, in recent years, has experienced homelessness. In 2022, journalist Fred Bridgland appealed to UK authorities, including the housing charity Shelter, for assistance, stating that Cebekhulu had "fallen through every crack in the bureaucratic system." His immigration status remains uncertain, and he has faced the threat of deportation. Cebekulu has since published a book in 2024 tittled :"Winnie Mandela, Stompie Moeketsi & Me; My story of a notorious murder and the events that followed".

== See also ==
- Winnie Madikizela-Mandela
- Stompie Seipei
- Jerry Richardson
- Truth and Reconciliation Commission
