= The Resurrection of Winnie Mandela =

2018 biography of Winnia Mandela by Sisonke Msimang

- Author: Sisonke Msimang
- Subject: Winnie Madikizela-Mandela
- Publisher: Jonathan Ball Publishers
- Publication date: 2018

The Resurrection of Winnie Mandela is a biography of South African activist and politician Winnie Madikizela-Mandela, written by Sisonke Msimang in 2018. The biography "unashamedly" attempts to redeem the character of Mandela, a controversial figure.

== Background ==
Winnie Mandela was the second wife of former South Africa President Nelson Mandela. After he was imprisoned for his political activities, Winnie became his representation and continued working to end apartheid. Winnie was constantly being monitored by the government. She was arrested under the Suppression of Terrorism Act. She spent over a year in solitary confinement and when she was released she continued being an activist.

Winnie began to become widely known for validating deadly retaliation against citizens who cooperated with the apartheids regime. The Mandela United Football Club, which was a group of her bodyguards, developed a reputation for cruelty. They are said to be responsible for the abduction and killing of a 14-year-old boy named Stompie Moeketsi. Winnie was also known for endorsing "necklacing" which was when a tire was placed around someone's neck and then set on fire.

== Assessment of Mandela, and criticism ==
Extracts of the book were published in The Sydney Morning Herald and News24.

Msimang's biography was published in September 2018, a month before another biography of Mandela, Truth, Lies and Alibis: A Winnie Mandela Story by Fred Bridgland. Msimang admired Mandela to a certain extent, and says she came to have a more nuanced view of Mandela. Where Mandela was typically cast either as a saint or a demon, Msimang acknowledges the good Mandela did without, she says, denying her guilt in the death of Stompie Moeketsi, or in the disappearance of two young men accused of being police informers who were abducted in 1988 and murdered soon after. Msimang's interest is in giving what she considers a more honest appraisal: Mandela's actions need to be regarded in the context of other violence condoned or enacted by the ANC and its members; in other words, she was no radical. In addition, she needs to be judged also in the light of the racism and sexism of her time; sexist double standards were often applied in judging her. Msimang disagrees with Bridgland on some factual details; for instance, Mandela's alleged culpability in the shooting death of Abu Baker Asvat is based on nothing but rumors, she wrote.

Keith Gottschalk, commenting on Msimang and Bridgland books in a review article published originally in The Conversation, did not criticize or praise either one, focusing on the difference between the two books, and to which extent they indicated that the controversy over Mandela's life and work continues. Heribert Adam, writing on the same two books for the London Review of Books, does give explicit criticism in an extensive review. Noting that Msimang explicitly wanted to redeem Mandela (whereas Bridgland says he focuses on the victims of her actions), he comments that her interest, as she explained to him in an email message, was not so much in the facts but rather in the meaning of Mandela for South Africans. He criticizes her for denying the evidence that, according to Adam, points at Mandela's guilt in the murder of Asvat. But he is most critical of what he sees as a failure to actually hold Mandela to account: "Msimang fails to resolve a crucial contradiction in her argument: if Winnie was indeed the independent, free and politically committed person she portrays, she can also be held responsible for her deeds--something Msimang refuses to do."
