= Sizwe Sithole =

South African anti-apartheid activist (c.1969-1990)

- Born: Clayton Sizwe Sithole c.1969
- Died: January 29, 1990; John Vorster Square, Johannesburg, South Africa
- Cause of death: Alleged suicide in jail
- Occupation: Member of Mandela United Football Club

Clayton Sizwe Sithole (1969 - 29 January 1990) was a South African anti-apartheid political activist and member of the Mandela United Football Club (MUFC), a controversial militant vigilante unit closely associated with Winnie Madikizela-Mandela and Jerry Richardson in the late 1980s in Soweto. Sithole was implicated in the killing of a fellow MUFC member and mysteriously died in police custody following a judicial inquiry into his actions.

Police said they found him hanging by a belt and shoelaces fastened to a shower water pipe.

== Alleged crime and death ==
In October 1988, Sithole was accused of being involved in the murder of fellow MUFC member, Kenneth "Thole" Dlamini, who was killed after testifying against another member in court. The Truth and Reconciliation Commission (TRC) determined that Sithole had executed Dlamini, who was labeled an informer.

According to some accounts, Sithole had a romantic relationship with Zindzi Mandela, daughter of Madikizela-Mandela.

He died by alleged suicide on 3 February 1990 while being held at John Vorster Square police station. The circumstances of his death remained murky, with suggestions that interrogators sought to suppress further disclosures by killing him.

Sithole’s death came amid a broader investigation into MUFC's violent acts, including the 1988 abduction and killing of Stompie Seipei. Testimonies later implicated Madikizela-Mandela and MUFC members in numerous killings, abductions and torture of suspected informers.
