= Trial of Winnie Mandela =

Criminal trial in South Africa

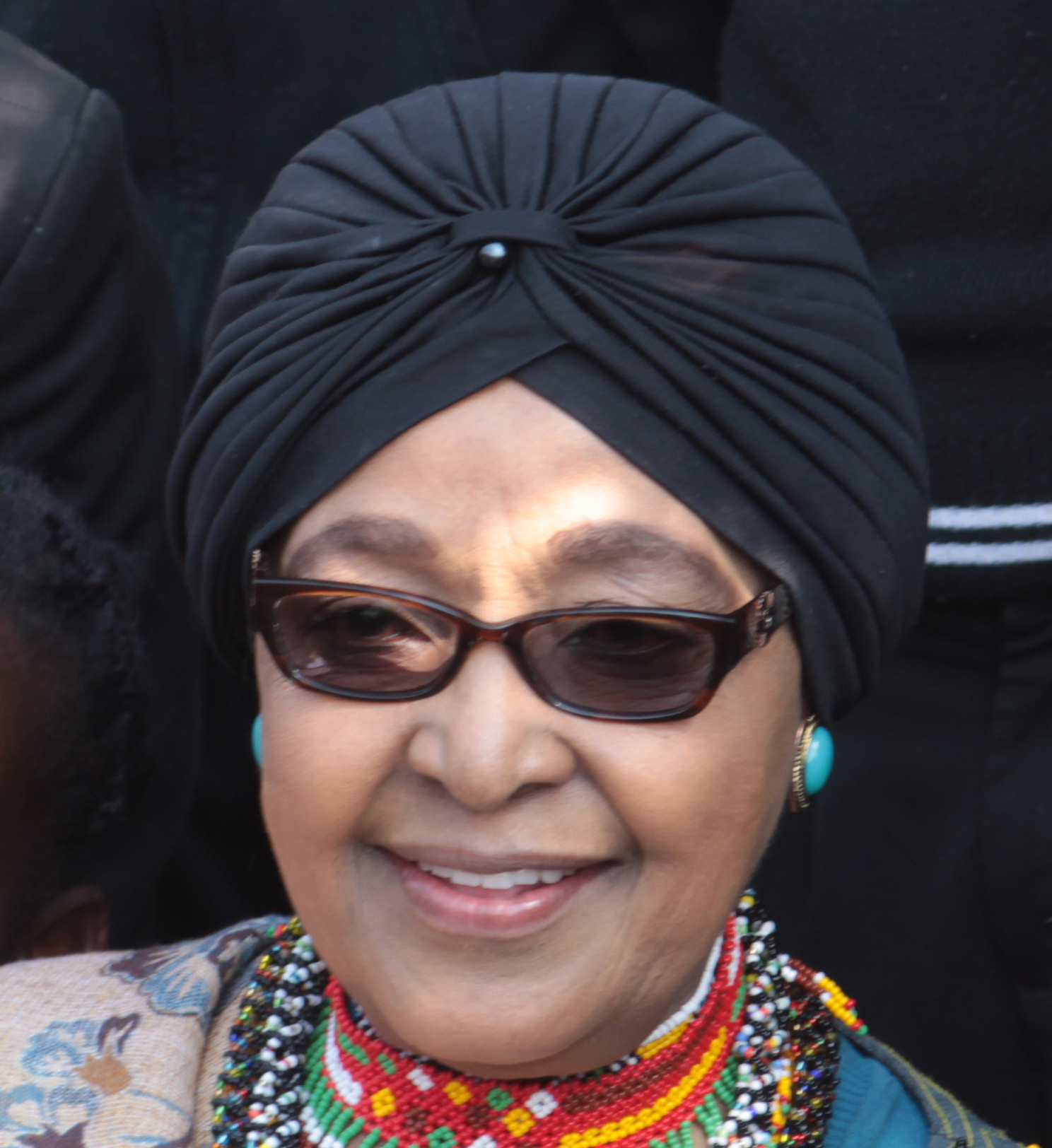
- Winnie Mandela in 2014
- Court: Supreme Court of South Africa
- Full case name: State v. Winifred Madikizela-Mandela and Others
- Decided: 13 May 1991
- Verdict: Guilty on four counts of kidnapping and being an accessory to assault

Case history
- Related actions: Truth and Reconciliation Commission hearings (1997)

Court membership
- Judge sitting: Michael Stahl Stegmann

Winnie Madikizela-Mandela, an anti-apartheid activist and then-wife of Nelson Mandela, faced a high-profile trial in 1991 for her involvement in the kidnapping and assault of four youths in 1988. One of the victims, 14-year-old Stompie Seipei, was found murdered. The case attracted international attention, exposing tensions within the African National Congress (ANC) and the broader anti-apartheid movement.

In February 1991, Winnie Mandela and seven co-accused, including members of the Mandela United Football Club, were brought before the Johannesburg Supreme Court, charged with four counts of kidnapping and four counts of being an accessory after the fact to assault.

The prosecution team argued that Winnie Mandela had ordered the abduction of the youths from the Methodist manse in Soweto to her house, suspecting them of being police informants. They were beaten at her house, like Stompie Seipei who was beaten and killed. The state presented testimony from the surviving victims, who alleged that Winnie Mandela was present during their beatings at her Soweto residence. The key witness was Jerry Richardson, the Mandela United coach, who later admitted to murdering Seipei and was sentenced to life in prison.

However, Winnie Mandela’s legal team, led by George Bizos, argued that the charges lacked direct evidence linking her to the fatal assault. They argued that her prosecution was politically motivated, aiming to undermine her and Nelson Mandela’s influence as negotiations to end apartheid progressed.

On 13 May 1991, Justice Michael Stegmann found Winnie Mandela guilty on four counts of kidnapping and as an accessory to assault. She was sentenced to six years in prison on 14 May 1991. However, she appealed the conviction and in 1993, the sentence was reduced to a fine and a two-year suspended sentence.

In 1997, during South Africa's Truth and Reconciliation Commission (TRC) hearings, additional evidence emerged implicating Mandela in human rights violations. TRC ruled that she had been complicit in Seipei’s death and had played a role in fostering a climate of violence through the Mandela United Football Club. However, she was not formally prosecuted beyond the 1991 trial.

The trial had significant repercussions for Winnie Mandela’s political career and public image. While she remained a respected anti-apartheid figure, the case deepened divisions within the ANC. Some saw her as a victim of state persecution, while others believed her actions had tarnished the liberation movement.
