= Abu Baker Asvat =

South African medical doctor

- Born: 23 February 1943; Vrededorp, Johannesburg
- Died: 27 January 1989 (aged 46); Soweto
- Cause of death: Multiple gunshot wounds
- Resting place: Avalon Cemetery
- Occupation: Medical doctor
- Known for: Medical doctor in Soweto, anti-apartheid activist, cricketer, and murder victim
- Title: Dr
- Spouse: Zorah

Abu Baker Asvat (/ɑsfat/) (23 February 1943 – 27 January 1989), also known as Abu Asvat or Abu nicknamed Hurley was a South African medical doctor who practised in Soweto in the 1970s and 1980s. A founding member of Azapo, Asvat was the head of its health secretariat, and involved in initiatives aimed at improving the health of rural black South Africans during Apartheid.

In 1989, Asvat was shot dead in his clinic, and he died in the arms of his nurse, Albertina Sisulu. His death has been linked to that of Stompie Seipei four weeks earlier, with allegations that Winnie Mandela (whose personal physician Asvat was) paid for his murder as part of a cover-up of Seipei's killing, being presented to South Africa's Truth and Reconciliation Commission.

== Early life and family ==
Asvat was born in Fietas into Gujarati Indian family. His father was a migrant shopkeeper, and he had two brothers. After attending the local high school, Asvat travelled to South Asia for his tertiary education, spending time in East Pakistan and West Pakistan, completing his medical studies in Karachi. While in Karachi, Asvat was involved in the student politics, founded a student organisation affiliated to the Pan Africanist Congress of Azania (PAC), and hosted its cadres en route to China.

Asvat married his wife Zorah in 1977, and they had three children.

== Soweto surgery ==
After returning to South Africa when he completed his studies, Asvat obtained a post at Johannesburg's Coronation Hospital (now Rahima Moosa Mother and Child Hospital). He became increasingly politicised when observing the racism of the white senior staff, segregated facilities, and racially unequal pay and conditions. He was fired after he confronted a white pharmaceutical representative who refused to speak to black doctors.

Asvat took over a small surgery in Soweto from his brother, and soon established a thriving practice, often treating more than 100 patients a day, often on a pro bono basis. During the 1976 Soweto Uprising, Asvat treated numerous children who were shot by the police, and his surgery was guarded by residents of a nearby squatter camp. His activities made him known in political circles, and he soon came to be called "the people's doctor" in Soweto. Asvat also opened a creche and soup kitchen for residents of Soweto's informal settlements. In contrast to other township doctors, Asvat projected a humble image, and insisted on patients calling him "Abu". He used the methods of the Brazilian radical educationalist Paolo Freire to guide his work with grassroots communities.

== Black consciousness movement ==
Asvat was drawn to the black consciousness movement in the aftermath of the 1976 uprising, which represented the only above-ground resistance movement in Soweto, at the time, and he was attracted to Steve Biko's conception of blackness. He was an important link between Lenasia, the Indian township that he lived in, and neighbouring Soweto, discarding the racial and social taboos of the time. Asvat was beaten, and had his life threatened by a Special Branch policeman in 1978, as part of an ongoing campaign of harassment. Although committed to the Black Consciousness movement he was known to be non-sectarian and worked with a wide range of anti-apartheid forces.

Asvat received the first annual human rights award from The Indicator, a newspaper based in Lenasia. He emphasized in his speech, "Let us have social mingling. Let Soweto swarm Lenasia. Let Eldorado Park swarm Lenasia. Let Lenasia swarm Eldorado Park. Let Lenasia swarm Soweto. Then we will have put into practice what we preach. We can't wait until liberation because once liberation is on it is not going to be easy to mend the injustice and the oppression that this harsh system has done to the people in this country. We've got to start now in practical terms."

== Cricket ==
Asvat, a keen cricketer, was involved in the desegregation of the sport in the Transvaal. He played for a team called The Crescents in Lenasia.

He initially embraced an attempt by Ali Bacher in the late 1970s to allow black teams to compete at white grounds ("Normal Cricket"), however, he became disillusioned after realising that facilities at white cricket venues remained racially segregated. He co-founded the Transvaal Cricket Board (TCB), which rejected Bacher's "multi-racial" approach to the sport, which the TCB saw as perpetuating the racial divisions of apartheid, and instead embraced a "non-racial" vision, which rejected Apartheid racial divisions. The TCB organised successful boycotts against Normal Cricket initiatives, and the TCB league grew under Asvat's leadership.

Asvat voluntarily stepped down as leader of the TCB in 1981, but remained a cricketer for the rest of his life, playing for the Crescents, and organising a junior league in the late 1980s.

== Azapo Health Secretariat ==
In 1982, Azapo created the Community Health Awareness Project (Chap). As part of this initiative, Asvat and others would travel throughout South Africa on weekends, towing medically equipped caravans funded by Asvat, providing healthcare to neglected non-urban areas, sometimes treating between 150 and 500 patients in a weekend, and providing health lectures to groups of up to 6 000 people.

In 1984, as part of this project, he compiled a 20 page manual on basic healthcare. Thousands of copies were distributed, in English, Sotho, Northern Sotho and Zulu. He also worked with the Black Allied Mining and Construction Workers Union (BAMWCU) to expose conditions in South Africa's asbestos mining towns, where children played in exposed mine dumps, and asbestosis was common in mineworkers.

Asvat and his associates also traveled to the Vaal Triangle during unrest in there in 1984, to treat those hurt in the violence, and to document injuries inflicted by the apartheid security forces.

By the mid-1980s, Asvat was commonly quoted in major newspapers, and became a prominent voice in the anti-apartheid movement on health issues. In 1988, he criticised the apartheid government's handling of the emerging AIDS epidemic. He also had a regular column in The Sowetan where he answered readers' health questions.

== 1980s ==
Asvat hired anti-apartheid activist Albertina Sisulu to work as his nurse, in 1984. Sisulu was the wife of then-imprisoned ANC leader Walter Sisulu and a co-president of the United Democratic Front (UDF). Sisulu was unable to practice as a nurse due to banning orders placed on her by the apartheid government, however Asvat employed her, paid her when she was detained by the apartheid security forces, and allowed her to visit her husband at Robben Island frequently. Despite sharp political differences between the UDF and AZAPO, that erupted into violence-resulting in many deaths and injuries-Albertina Sisulu and Asvat continued working together, and treated casualties from both sides of the conflict.

Asvat became involved in the plight of Soweto squatters, and would rush into Soweto at night in order to assist those whose shacks were under threat by the Soweto Town Council (a structure created by the apartheid government), and the West Rand Administration Board (WRAB). His actions brought him into increasing conflict with these bodies. He would often arrange emergency alternative shelter in Lenasia, and would, occasionally feed or house displaced persons in his own home.

Asvat was elected president of the newly formed Lenasia-based People’s Education Committee (PEC), despite his Black Consciousness ideology differing from the pro-ANC views of the rest of the organisation. The PEC aimed to enable black youths to be educated after township schooling was severely disrupted in the aftermath of the 1976 riots. Among the programmes of the PEC, was a campaign to get black African children admitted to House of Delegates-run segregated Indian schools. This campaign attained some success, and by 1990, 15% of students in Lenasia came from the surrounding African areas.

During the 1986 State of Emergency in South Africa, and with Asvat underground, an attempt was made by unknown forces to fire-bomb his home in Lenasia. Eight months later, Asvat survived an attempted stabbing by two assailants at his surgery, where he was slightly wounded in the face. Albertina Sisulu raised the alarm with neighbours, while Asvat fended an assailant off. Asvat's wife was also routinely harassed by special branch police at home.

In 1988, a gunman pulled a weapon on Asvat, but fled when a patient entered the room. Also in 1988, the authorities decided to develop the squatter camp where Asvat's practice was situated in the "Chicken Farm" area of Soweto. However, Asvat refused to move, unless alternative accommodations were provided for his practice. He and Albertina Sisulu continued working in the practice, even when the authorities cut power to his surgery. Asvat eventually moved his practice to Rockville in Soweto, where he continued to be harassed by the Security Police.

== Murder ==
On the afternoon of 27 January 1989, two men arrived at Asvat's surgery, claiming to need treatment. Once admitted to the surgery by Albertina Sisulu, they drew a firearm and shot Asvat twice, killing him. Sisulu sat next to him as he died, as she waited for an ambulance, later telling Asvat's relatives that "My son died in my hands".

In the period immediately before the murder, Asvat became uncharacteristically fearful, and the night before his death, he drove home on a flat tyre, telling his wife that he thought that an unspecified 'they' were trying to set him up for attack. He appeared to be extremely distracted the night before his death, and made two attempts to see his lawyers the next morning.

Investigations into Asvat's murder led to two suspects, Zakhele Mbatha and Thulani Dlamini. They were sentenced to death, with the motive being described as robbery (the sentences were commuted following the abolition of the death penalty in South Africa). However, Asvat's family found that no money had been taken, and the Truth and Reconciliation Commission found that the police were negligent in hastily ascribing a motive of robbery to the attack, and for failing to thoroughly investigate the attack.

Within days of Asvat's killing, rumours began to circulate linking his death to Winnie Mandela. Asvat and Winnie Mandela had first made contact during one of Asvat's rural clinics in Brandfort, where she had been banished by the apartheid government. Asvat and Winnie Mandela established a soup kitchen and clinic, and he assumed responsibility for her care, with Asvat sometimes driving to Brandfort in the middle of the night to treat her. Mandela would regularly dine with the Asvat family after she returned to Soweto from Brandfort, and attended parties at the Asvat home.

Soon after Asvat's murder, Winnie Mandela gave an interview to a Sunday newspaper claiming that he was killed because he could corroborate (baseless) allegations that Methodist minister Paul Verryn had molested Stompie Seipei. However, media sources soon began to report on rumours that Asvat had been killed at the behest of Winnie Mandela, as he had examined the boy, and insisted that he be taken to hospital due to the severity of his injuries following the assaults by Mandela's security detail, thus making Asvat's death part of an alleged cover-up orchestrated by Winnie Mandela. In 2018 a new biography of Winnie Mandela by Fred Bridgland argued that she was behind the murder of Asvat.

The reasoning behind the Paul Verryn allegations allegedly came about after Kenny Kgase, one of four boys taken from minister Paul Verryn's manse and brought to Winnie Mandela's Diepkloof house by her Mandela United Football Club, escaped from Mandela's home in the absence of a guard and fled to the Methodist Church regional headquarters in Johannesburg. Once minister Paul Verryn arrived, he took Kgase to see a doctor, Martin Connell, who after treating extensive injuries, sheltered Kgase for a few weeks. Kgase told Verryn of the horrible state he had seen Stompie and how he had vanished from Winnie Mandela's house.

Thabiso Mono, another one of the kidnapped boys, said that Winnie Mandela had accused him and the others of allowing Paul Verryn to sleep with them, as well as accused Stompie Seipei of being a police informant. He recounted being beaten by Winnie and the United Football Club Guard.

Winnie Mandela ordered Katiza Cebekhulu to file a police report accusing Paul Verryn of molesting the kidnapped boys. In order to officially file a report, a certificate from a doctor who examined the boys was required. At Dr. Asvat's clinic, Cebekhulu stated "I made out Winnie shouting: ‘If you don’t cooperate, I’ll deal with you!" Cebekhulu and Winnie left without Dr. Asvat providing a medical certificate, which Cebekhulu said angered Winnie.

Years after the police report, Cebekhulu said he was ordered to show two youths, Zakhele Cyril Mbatha and Thulani Nicholas Dlamini, the location of Dr. Asvat's workplace.

=== Truth and Reconciliation Commission (TRC) ===
One of Winnie Mandela's supporters, Katiza Cebekhulu, testified at the TRC that he had witnessed a "volcanic row" between Mandela and Asvat, after Asvat refused to back Mandela's (baseless) charges that Verryn had sodomised boys. The hearings were later adjourned amid claims by TRC lawyers that witnesses were intimidated on Winnie Mandela's orders.

Mbatha and Dlamini both claimed in testimony to the TRC that Winnie Mandela had paid them R20,000 (equivalent to $8,000 at the time), and that she provided them with a gun to kill Asvat. Both also claimed to have been intimidated by Mandela prior to testifying at the TRC. Mbatha also claimed that he had immediately implicated Mandela in the murder, but was forced by police to change his confession to the attack being a robbery, due to torture. It emerged that Dlamini's 1989 confession implicated Winnie Mandela, but it was not presented by the police to the court trying Mbatha and Dlamini, with the police justifying the suppression by arguing that the confession was "at odds" with their investigation. A group of men in combat fatigues associated with Winnie Mandela were accused by Mbata's lawyers of attempting to intimidate his family during a TRC hearing. Winnie Mandela's lawyer exposed inconsistencies in their testimony.

When Albertina Sisulu testified, she failed to corroborate an appointment card that would have placed Winnie Mandela at the surgery on the morning of the killing, claiming to have forgotten much about the day of the murder. When it was hinted at by a TRC commissioner that Sisulu did not want to be remembered in history as having implicated a comrade, she denied this.

One of the kidnapped boys, Thabiso Mono, when asked if he knew that Winnie Mandela had claimed to be in Brandfort on the day of the assaults on the boys, stated "I saw her. She was the person assaulting us with fists and hitting us with sjamboks."

During her own testimony to the commission, Madikizela-Mandela denied the allegations.

The final report of the TRC stated that the Commission was unable to verify the allegations implicating Winnie Mandela in the murder of Asvat, and criticised the police for too quickly jumping to the conclusion that the motive for the murder was robbery, and for not investigating the apparent connection between Cebekhulu and Dlamini's accounts of the killings, and it referred to Mbatha and Dlamini's (the murderers) testimonies as not being credible.

=== Subsequent developments ===
In January 2018, prior to Winnie Mandela's death, ANC MP Mandla Mandela, Nelson Mandela's grandson by his first wife, Evelyn Mase, called for Winnie Mandela's role in the Asvat and Sepei murders to be probed.

== Funeral ==
Asvat was buried in accordance with Muslim rites the day after he was murdered. Thousands of people, both African, and Indian, attended his funeral at Avalon Cemetery, and marchers in the funeral procession toyi-toyied and had sung struggle songs on arrival at his home prior to the funeral procession. Apartheid police who attempted to seize Azapo banners were driven off by Lenasia residents, and many women were present at his burial.

== Legacy ==
The section of the R554 road linking Soweto to Lenasia was renamed Abu Baker Asvat Drive by the post-apartheid government. A junior cricket tournament was instituted in Asvat's memory, in 2002. He was awarded the Order of Luthuli in Silver by President Cyril Ramaphosa in 2021.
