= Mbizana =

Mbizana may refer to:

- Bizana, a town in the Eastern Cape province of South Africa
- Winnie Madikizela-Mandela Local Municipality, formerly Mbizana Municipality, in the Eastern Cape province of South Africa
