= George Fivaz =

South African Police officer

John George Fivaz SSA SOE was the former South African Police Service national commissioner. He was appointed on 29 January 1995 by Nelson Mandela for five years with his primary responsibility to consolidate the eleven separate policing agencies into a unified force.

== Early life ==
George Fivaz was born on 23 December 1945 in Reitz, Free State province of South Africa.

== Stompie Seipei trial ==
Fivaz declared allegations of the late struggle icon Winnie Madikizela-Mandela for the murder of Stompie Seipei as baseless.
