= Sisonke Msimang =

South African-Australian writer

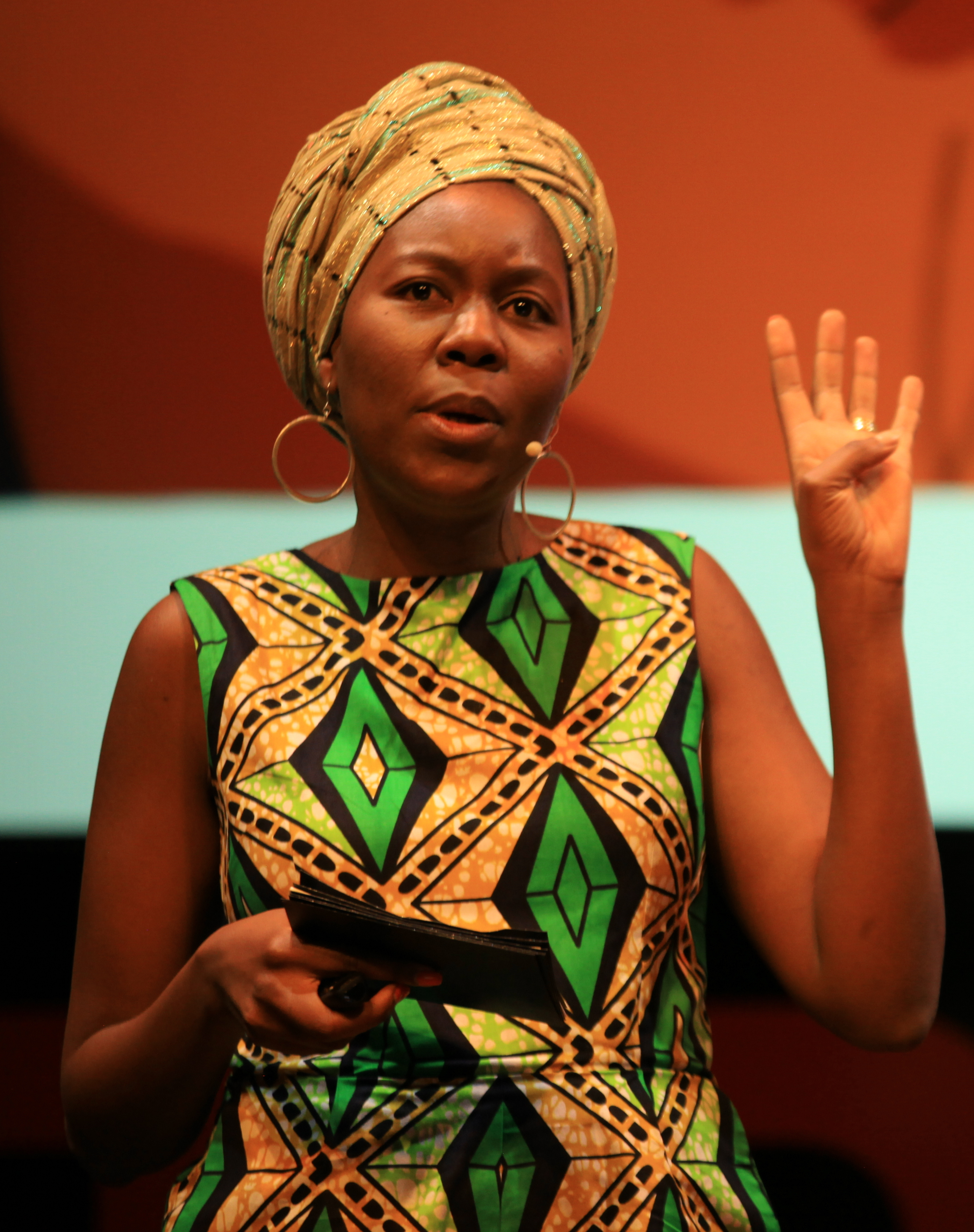
- Msimang speaks at TEDx Soweto in 2014
- Born: Lusaka, Zambia
- Education: Macalester College; University of Cape Town
- Occupations: Writer, political analyst, activist
- Years active: 1990s–present
- Known for: Always Another Country: A memoir of exile and home (2017); The Resurrection of Winnie Mandela (2018)
- Children: 2
- Parent: Mavuso Msimang (father)

Sisonke Msimang is a South African-Australian writer, activist, and political analyst based in Perth, Western Australia, whose focus is on race, gender, and politics. She is known for her memoir Always Another Country: A memoir of exile and home (2017) and The Resurrection of Winnie Mandela (2018), a biography of anti-apartheid activist Winnie Madikizela-Mandela. She was born in exile in Zambia, as her father, Mavuso Msimang, was a member of uMkhonto weSizwe, the armed wing of the African National Congress during its struggle against apartheid in South Africa.

== Early life and education ==
Sisonke Msimang was born in Lusaka, Zambia, where her South African freedom fighter father, Mavuso Msimang, had gone into exile, along with many other members of the then banned organisation the African National Congress (ANC). Her mother, Ntombi, was a Swazi accountant, and Sisonke grew up within the community in exile, along with sisters Mandla and Zeng.

Msimang initially grew up around South African freedom fighters such as her father and great-uncle. Her father was a leading member of uMkhonto we Sizwe (MK), the armed wing of the African National Congress (ANC), in the 1960s, and her great-uncle was one of the founding members of the ANC. The family later moved to Kenya and then to Canada in 1984 when Sisonke was 10. Msimang completed most of her schooling in Ottawa, Canada, and her final years at the International School in Kenya as an expatriate.

Between 1992 and 1996, Msimang earned a Bachelor of Arts degree in politics and communication studies at Macalester College in Saint Paul, Minnesota, and returned to South Africa in 1997. She decided to begin a career in human rights and social justice, which led her to become an activist.

Between 2002 and 2005, she obtained a master's degree in political science from the African Gender Institute at the University of Cape Town.

== Career ==
Msimang's first job was in 1997 as a programme officer at the Australian High Commission in Pretoria, where she met her husband Simon White.

From 2003 to 2005, Msimang worked as a gender advisor for UNAIDS to help forge HIV/AIDS policies specifically relating to African women and girls. From 2005, she was the executive director of the Open Society Initiative for Southern Africa, until November 2012. In June 2013, she took up a senior role in policy development at the Sonke Gender Justice Network, which worked with men and boys in promoting gender equality.

Msimang began her writing career in earnest from 2013, writing regular columns for theDaily Maverick. In her first book, Always Another Country, she thanks editor Branko Brkic and CEO Styli Charalambous for "giving me a start".

She has been both storyteller and facilitator for The Moth and TED events, has hosted and participated in several Doha Debates, and in 2020 was the Literature and Ideas curator for Perth Writers Week.

In March 2026, Msimang presented three podcast episodes for for ABC Radio National's Rewind series, under the title Boycott!, about the anti-apartheid activism both within and outside South Africa, including Australia's part in boycotts.

As of 2026 Msimang is Head Story Trainer at the Centre for Stories in Perth.

== Recognition and awards ==
Msimang has held fellowships at Yale University (where she was a Yale World Fellow in 2012), the Aspen Institute, and the University of the Witwatersrand in Johannesburg. She was also selected as a World Economic Forum Young Global Leader.

She was an honorary board member of the South African non-profit Democracy Works Foundation in 2016, and until at least 2024, but is no longer on the board.

In 2020, Msimang won the Western Australian Writer's Fellowship at the Western Australian Premier's Book Awards.

== Works ==
In 2017, Always Another Country: A memoir of exile and home was published in South Africa, with the Australian edition published the following year. a memoir in which she describes her childhood and living in different countries, including what South Africa was like when she returned to it. Written after the sudden death in 2014 of her beloved mother Ntombi, who had championed microfinance for female entrepreneurs in South Africa, the book was highly praised by authors Tim Winton, Njabulo S. Ndebele and Alice Pung, and earned accolades such the New York Times 2018 staff favourite of 2018 and CBC's Best International Non-fiction of 2018. She writes in it about her upbringing among the ANC exiles: "Reft of a physical place in this world we can call home, exile makes us love the idea of South Africa. We are bottle-fed the dream: South Africa is not simply about non-racialism and equality but something much more profound".

The next year she wrote The Resurrection of Winnie Mandela, an investigation of the rise and fall of anti-apartheid activist and ex-wife of Nelson Mandela, Winnie Madikizela-Mandela. She has written for a range of international publications such as The New York Times, The Daily Maverick, The Guardian, and Washington Post. She is also a contributor to the 2019 anthology New Daughters of Africa, edited by Margaret Busby.

== Personal life ==
In 2014, Msimang moved to Perth, Western Australia, where she lives with her Australian husband, their two children and his children from a previous relationship.

When attending an Invasion Day rally in Perth with a Noongar colleague on Australia Day (26 January) 2026, Msimang saw an object land nearby which she could not identify, but handed it to two police officers. It turned out to be a "fragment bomb" that did not detonate, in an attempted bombing of the rally. The alleged perpetrator was later charged with one count of engaging in a terrorist attack.
