= Mbhongweni =

- Location within Eastern Cape Location within South Africa
- Coordinates: 30.800°S 29.483°E
- Country: South Africa
- Province: Eastern Cape
- District: Winnie Madikizela-Mandela

Area
  - Total: 8.86 km^{2} (3.42 sq mi)

Population
  - Total: 3,104
  - Density: 350/km^{2} (907/sq mi)

Racial makeup (2011)
  - Black African: 100%

First languages (2011)
  - Xhosa: 94%
  - Other: 6%
- Time zone: UTC+2 (SAST)

Mbhongweni (formerly Mbongweni) is a village in Winnie Madikizela-Mandela Local Municipality in the Eastern Cape province of South Africa. It is situated 33 km away from Mbizana.

The village is popularly known for the birth of Winnie Madikizela Mandela and Babalo Madikizela.

== Media ==
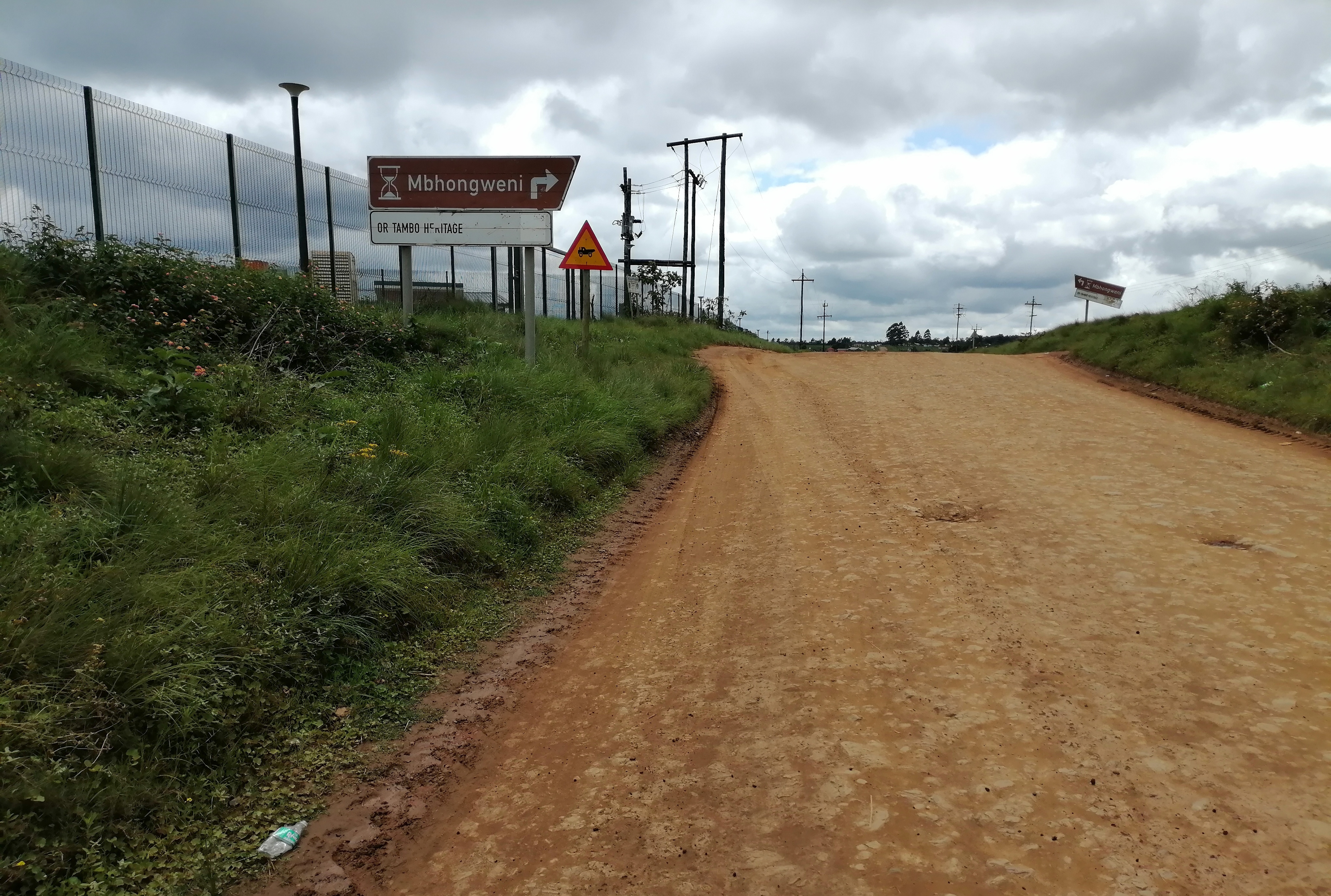
Mbhongweni Location roadway

== Births ==
- Winnie Madikizela-Mandela - (1936-2018) Anti-Apartheid Movement activist, president of the African National Congress Women's League
- Babalo Madikizela - (b. 1976) Eastern Cape MEC for Public Works
