= Mandela United Football Club =

South African vigilante group

- Formation: 1986
- Founder: Winnie Madikizela-Mandela
- Dissolved: 1990
- Purpose: Anti-apartheid enforcement unit
- Location: Soweto, South Africa
- Affiliations: African National Congress (ANC) (disputed)

The Mandela United Football Club was a controversial South African anti-apartheid group associated with Winnie Madikizela-Mandela in the late 1980s in Soweto. Though presented as a youth football team, the group functioned as a militant enforcement unit under Madikizela-Mandela’s influence, engaging in acts of violence, intimidation and killings of suspected police informers.

Led by Jerry Richardson as "coach", the team became infamous for its involvement in kidnappings, assaults, and extrajudicial executions, drawing scrutiny from the Truth and Reconciliation Commission (TRC) after the fall of apartheid.

== Formation and activities ==
The club was established around 1986 during a period of escalating anti-apartheid resistance in South Africa. Its members, mostly young men from Soweto, acted as bodyguards and enforcers for Winnie Madikizela-Mandela, an internationally known woman and wife of Nelson Mandela who was also a senior figure in the African National Congress (ANC). Though nominally a football club, its role extended far beyond sports, as members engaged in vigilantism against suspected informers and political opponents.

One of the key figures in the team was Jerry Richardson, who was the club’s "coach." In later testimony, he admitted to multiple killings and revealed that he had secretly worked as a police informant for the apartheid government, clandestinely directing police to leads and then accusing others of having done that which led to their murders.

== The kidnapping and murder of Stompie Seipei ==
One of the most infamous cases involving the Mandela United was the abduction and murder of 14-year-old Stompie Seipei in December 1988. Seipei, an anti-apartheid activist, was accused of being a police informer. Along with three other boys, he was kidnapped by Mandela United members and taken to Madikizela-Mandela’s residence in Diepkloof Extension, Soweto where he was beaten and killed under orders of Madikizela-Mandela. Richardson later confessed to personally murdering Stompie and was sentenced to life in prison. On 14 May 1991, a South African court sentenced Madikizela-Mandela to 6 years for ordering the murders of the activists.

During TRC hearings, Richardson admitted:

I was already involved in many killings, I was not prepared to kill these two boys.

However, he ultimately carried out the killing, reinforcing the brutality associated with the team’s activities.

== Claims of collaboration with Apartheid security forces ==
During cross-examination at the TRC hearings, Richardson initially denied, but later admitted to being a police informant. His handler, Sergeant Stephanus Pretorius, received intelligence from him, leading to an ambush that resulted in the deaths of two ANC guerrillas and Pretorius himself during a 1988 shootout at Richardson’s home. The shootout also led to the murder of two teens by the Mandela United after Richardson told Winnie Madikizela-Mandela that the two teens, Lolo Sono and Anthony Shabalala, were the ones who told the cops about the ANC guerrillas at his home.

== Truth and Reconciliation Commission findings ==
The TRC hearings into the Mandela United's activities painted a picture of widespread human rights violations, including torture, abductions, and extrajudicial killings. During the Truth and Reconciliation Commission hearings, former United Democratic Front (UDF) treasurer Azhar Cachalia disassociated the Mandela United from the anti-apartheid struggle of the African National Congress (ANC) and described the club as Winnie Madikizela-Mandela's "own personal vigilante gang," stating that she was either aware of or actively participated in their criminal activities.

Archbishop Desmond Tutu reprimanded Richardson for evasiveness during testimony, noting his lack of remorse. The TRC’s findings determined that Winnie Madikizela-Mandela bore "political and moral responsibility" for the actions of the Mandela United, though she denied direct involvement in the most serious crimes.

While Madikizela-Mandela later apologized for some of the Mandela United’s actions, she maintained that some accusations were politically motivated.

== Acts of murders ==
Jerry Richardson admitted that informers were targeted for elimination, often after being extensively interrogated.

- Stompie Seipei was murdered on January 1, 1989, after being accused of being a police informer. He was abducted from a Methodist manse, taken to Winnie Madikizela-Mandela’s house, beaten, and later killed. Katiza Cebekhulu testified that Madikizela-Mandela assaulted Seipei, and Jerry Richardson confessed to executing him.
- Dr. Abu-Baker Asvat was murdered on January 27, 1989, at his Soweto clinic by two armed men. Speculation arose linking his death to a prior medical examination he conducted and which related to an evidence pointing to a murder case.
- Lolo Sono and Anthony Shabalala were killed in 1988 after being accused of informing police about the presence of uMkhonto we Sizwe (MK) cadres at Richardson’s house, which led to a fatal raid. The teens remains were later found in Avalon Cemetery, Soweto.
- Quqi 'Kuki' Zwane was killed on December 18, 1988, after being accused of being an informer. It was later rumoured that Zwane's boyfriend, Sizwe Sithole, a member of the Mandela United Football Club, was also in love with Zindzi Mandela, a daughter of Madikizela-Mandela, and had a kid together. admitted to stabbing Zwane, slitting her throat, and dumping her body near Orlando railway station.

== Legacy ==
The Mandela United Football Club remains one of the most controversial entities in South Africa’s liberation history. Some see it as a radical but necessary defense force in the struggle against apartheid, while others regard it as a rogue group that undermined the liberation movement through violence and criminal activity. The TRC’s findings, along with Richardson’s confessions, confirmed that the club carried out unlawful killings and targeted perceived enemies within the anti-apartheid movement, leading to lasting debates over its role. Although Richardson died in prison in 2009, his testimony remains a critical source in understanding the murky history of the club, its connection to Madikizela-Mandela, and the complexities of South Africa’s liberation struggle.

== See also ==
- Jerry Richardson
- Winnie Madikizela-Mandela
- Stompie Seipei
- Katiza Cebekhulu
