= Mavuso Msimang =

South African politician

Mavuso Walter Msimang
- Born: 1941 (age 84–85); Edendale, outside Pietermaritzburg, South Africa
- Education: University of Zambia
- Known for: Politics
- Political party: African National Congress
- Children: 3, inc. Sisonke Msimang

Mavuso Walter Msimang (born 1941) is a South African civil servant and politician. He is a co-founder of African Parks, a Johannesburg-based conservation organisation, and HE was CEO of South African National Parks (SANparks). In the 1960s, he was a member of the military high command of uMkhonto we Sizwe (MK), the armed wing of the African National Congress (ANC).

== Early life and education ==
Mavuso Walter Msimang was born in 1941 at in Edendale, outside Pietermaritzburg, and grew up around missionaries. While living with his grandmother in Jobstown, outside Newcastle during his primary school years, he remained unaware that his parents had divorced, only learning of it when he returned to Edendale to start high school. In 1960, he matriculated at Inkamana High School, a Catholic school in Vryheid.

In 1976, he graduated from the University of Zambia with a Bachelor of Science degree in entomology, specialising in biochemistry. He also holds a Master of Business Administration from the United States International University, California.

== Early political involvement ==
In the 1960s, Msimang was stationed at the ANC military base in Kongwa, Tanzania, and in 1967 was Chief of Communications of MK. MK was a banned organisation which worked to topple the apartheid government in South African from the 1960s through to the early 1990s, when the country transitioned to majority rule.

He moved to Zambia, where there was a large community of South African ANC members living in exile. Here he met his wife, Ntombi, who was an accountant, and they had three daughters, including the writer and political analyst Sisonke Msimang. He earned a BSc in entomology and biology from the University of Zambia in 1976, and a master's degree in business administration in 1984 from the United States International University while living in Kenya. USIU was later taken over by Alliant International University.

Msimang worked as a UN volunteer from 1977 and later worked for the UN's World Food Programme in Kenya and Zambia between 1977 and 1984. From 1984 to 1987, he worked in both Ethiopia and Ottawa, Canada, for the World University Service of Canada (WUSC). From 1987 to 1991, he was the country director in Kenya for CARE Canada, and from 1991 to 1993 he was a senior project officer for UNICEF in Ethiopia and Eritrea.

== Post-apartheid career ==
Msimang moved back to South Africa after the end of apartheid with his family in 1993–1994, initially to Durban, where he worked as a business consultant and CEO of the Umthombo Pride Trust, before being appointed executive director of South African Tourism. He became CEO of South African National Parks in 1997, which had begun a major re-conceptualisation from 1994.

He was CEO at the State Information Technology Agency from October 2003 and 2007, before being appointed Director-General of the Department of Home Affairs in 2007. He retired from this role in 2010.

Msimang was one of the founders of African Parks Network, and is as of 2021 Emeritus Board Member. He has been a member of the World Wildlife Fund South Africa Board since February 2011, and as of 2021 and chairs the Social Ethics and Transformation Committee as well as sitting on the Board's Remuneration and Human Resources and Nomination Committees.

In the wake of diminished support for the ANC in the 2021 municipal elections, he has been critical of the factional politics within the party, in his capacity as a member of the ANC National Executive Committee. He did not stand for re-election to the NEC at the party's 55th National Conference in 2022.

During the third national conference of the African National Congress Veterans' League held in July 2023, Msimang was elected unopposed as deputy president of the league.

Msimang resigned from the ANC in December 2023, citing endemic corruption and its consequences for the country, especially the poor. A week later, it was reported that he had withdrawn his resignation after discussions with the Secretary General of the ANC, Fikile Mbalula.

=== Controversies ===
Msimang was accused of misappropriating funds from the Umthombo Pride Trust where he was CEO between 1993 and 1994. These claims were never proven and he blamed dismissed employees for the allegations.

In 2007, while CEO of SITA, Msimang was accused of sexual harassment. Charges were filed but later withdrawn. He blamed the media for circulating the allegations without getting his side of the story. One of his daughters, Sisonke Msimang, herself a women's rights activist, wrote a piece defending her father from the allegations and criticising the media and feminists for their reactions, saying that she was "saddened, but not surprised" by the latter. She also stated that the accuser was one of her former colleagues.

== Personal life ==
Msimang has three daughters, including writer Sisonke Msimang.
