= Jerry Richardson (South Africa) =

South African political activist and murderer (1949 - 2009

- Born: Jerry Vusumuzi Richardson; May 1949
- Died: April 2009
- Known for: Murder of Stompie Seipei; Coach of the Mandela United Football Club
- Political party: African National Congress (ANC)
- Movement: uMkhonto we Sizwe (MK), United Democratic Front (UDF)
- Status: Died in prison
- Criminal charges: Assault and murder
- Penalty: Death sentence commuted to Life imprisonment (sentenced in 1990)
- Capture status: Arrested
- Accomplice: Winnie Mandela

Details
- Victims: Stompie Seipei (convicted); Kuki 'Quqi' Zwane; Anthony Tshabalala; Lolo Sono
- Country: South Africa
- Location: Johannesburg
- Imprisoned at: Leeuwkop prison

Jerry Vusimuzi Richardson (May 1949 - April 2009) was an anti-apartheid South African activist and murderer convicted of killing Stompie Seipei. He was the "coach" of the Mandela United Football Club, a soccer team allegedly founded by Winnie Madikizela-Mandela in 1986 and whose members protected her house and engaged in vigilantism, and murdered suspected police informants in the anti-apartheid cycles of the African National Congress (ANC) and its military wing uMkhonto we Sizwe (MK) in Soweto.

== Overview ==
Richardson was arrested for the murder of Stompie Seipei, a 14-year-old teenage activist of the United Democratic Front on 19 February 1989. In May 1990 he was convicted for the murder and sentenced in August 1990 to death (commuted to life sentence).

He joined the ANC in 1975 and his house in Soweto's Mzimhlophe section was used as a sanctuary for MK members who were clandestinely leaving the country for military training.

On 9 November 1988, Richardson was arrested after a shootout at his house between police and two cadres of MK. A policeman, Sergeant Stephanus "Fannie" Pretorius, was killed in the shooting as well as the two cadres, Tebogo Maluleke and Sipho Mbenenge. He was released on 25 November 1988. In February 1989, Richardson was arrested again - this time for Seipei's murder.

Applying for amnesty before the Truth and Reconciliation Commission (TRC) in 1997, Richardson implicated Winnie Madikizela-Mandela in the murder of two young activists, Lolo Sono and Anthony Tshabalala, that occurred in December 1988. He testified that the boys were suspected of tipping off the police about the two MK cadres at his house on the day of the shooting of 9 December 1988; and that Madikizela-Mandela ordered that they be killed. The two teenage activists were taken from Methodist minister Paul Verryn's Soweto home to Madikizela-Mandela's in Orlando, where they were severely beaten. Richardson claimed that he took part in the beating and that Madikizela-Mandela gave the order to kill the youths. Their bodies were buried near a mine dump in Soweto.

He told the Commission that while serving his time in jail the police came to him in 1995 and paid him R10,000 to reveal the whereabouts of the bodies but could not find them. The TRC investigation team also failed to find the bodies. The Truth and Reconciliation Commission described Richardson as a "killing machine."

Richardson also implicated Madikizela-Mandela in the murder of Kuki Zwane, a young woman associated with the Mandela United Football Club who was killed in December 1988 after being accused of being a police informer. She was in love with a Mandela United FC player and frequented Madikizela-Mandela's house to see her boyfriend, Sizwe Sithole, who was also alleged to be Zindzi Mandela's boyfriend.

She was taken from Madikizela-Mandela's house at night and lured into an open field, stabbed, her throat slit and dumped near the Orlando railway station by Richardson and two other men. Zwane’s remains were discovered on 18 December 1988.

On 14 May 1991, a South African court sentenced Madikizela-Mandela to 6 years for ordering the murders of the activists, a sentence which was commuted by an appeals court to a $3000 fine and a two-year suspended sentence.

In 1997, Madikizela-Mandela appeared before the TRC to apply for amnesty and denied all the accusations levelled against her by Richardson. She described them as "ludicrous and the worst lunacy"

== Death ==
Richardson died in jail in April 2009 of natural causes.
