= Central Methodist Church, Johannesburg =

Central Methodist Mission, Johannesburg
- Central Methodist Church
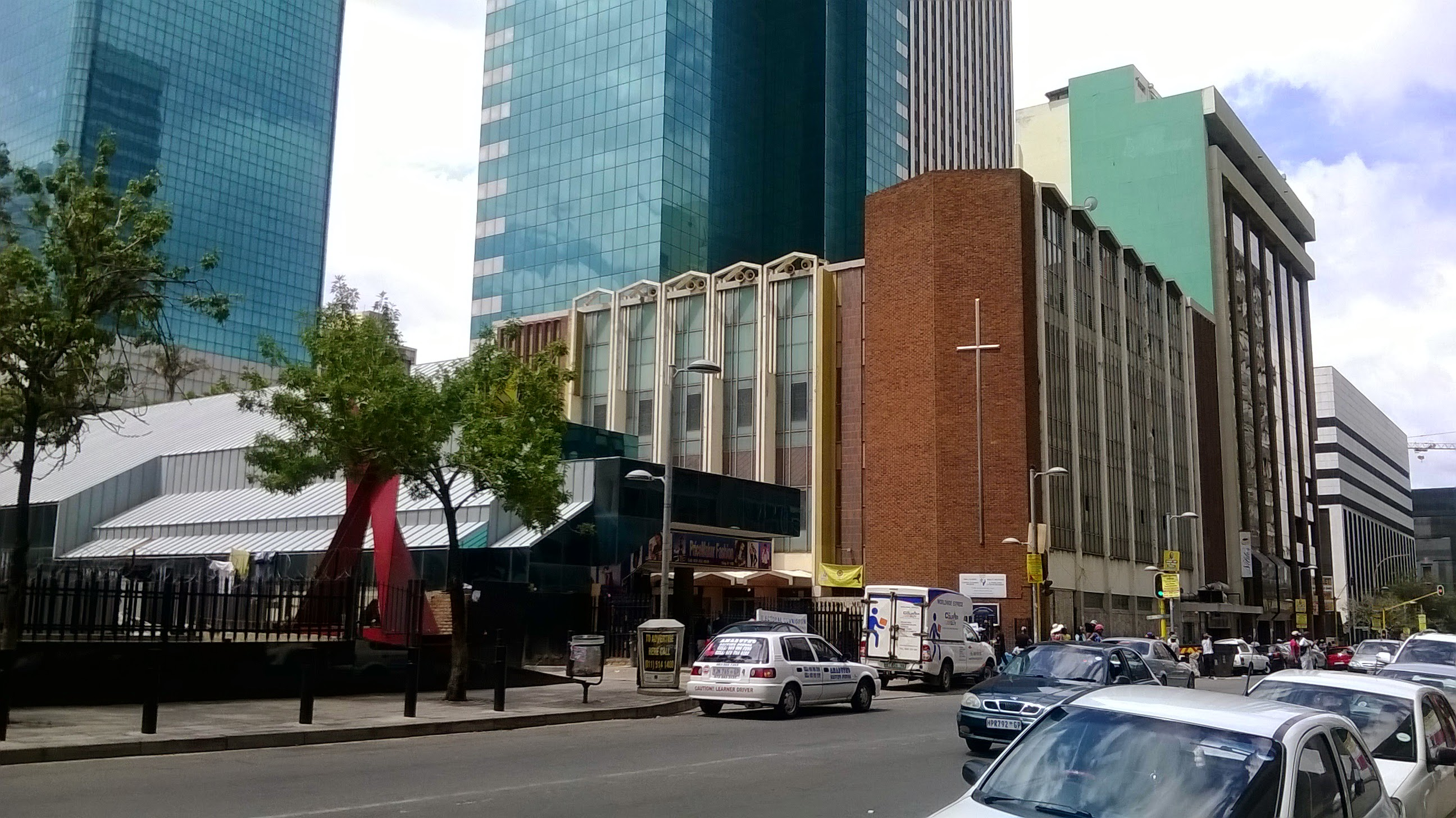
- Central Methodist Mission on Pritchard Street, Johannesburg
- Central Methodist Mission, Johannesburg
- 26.2041°S 28.0383°E
- Location: Corner of Pritchard and Smal Streets, Johannesburg, South Africa
- Country: South Africa
- Denomination: Methodist Church of Southern Africa

History
- Status: Church

Architecture
- Functional status: Active
- Architect: Unknown
- Style: Modernist
- Completed: 1967

Specifications
- Capacity: 1500 (main sanctuary)

Administration
- District: Central District: Rev Nomsa Mabaso (retired)

The Central Methodist Mission (CMM) is a prominent Methodist church located in the inner city of Johannesburg, South Africa. Situated at the corner of Pritchard and Smal Streets, the church has served as both a religious center and a site of significant social activism, particularly in support of the urban poor and refugees.

== History ==
Methodism arrived in Johannesburg shortly after the city's founding in the late 19th century. The first Methodist congregation was established in the 1880s at the corner of President and Kruis Streets, known as the President Street Church. As the city grew, the need for a larger and more centrally located place of worship became evident. In 1919, a new building, Central Hall, was erected at Pritchard and Kruis Streets to serve this purpose.

In 1967, the church moved into its current five-storey building on the corner of Pritchard and Smal Streets. On 15 October of that year, the space was formally opened for worship. In 1985, under the leadership of Peter Storey, the congregation adopted the name Central Methodist Mission, aligning itself more explicitly with the Methodist tradition of social engagement and prophetic ministry.

== Ministers (1915–present) ==
The following individuals have served as superintendents or ministers-in-charge of the Central Methodist Church:

- Rev. J. Glynowr Davies (1915–1918)
- Rev. William Meara (1919–1935)
- Rev. Arthur S. Clegg (1936–1941)
- Rev. J.B. Webb (1942–1964)
- Rev. S.G. Pitts (1965–1975)
- Rev. Peter J. Storey (1976–1991)
- Rev. Mvume Dandala (1992–1996)
- Rev. Paul Verryn (1997–2014)
- Rev. Ndumiso R. Ncombo (2015–2023)
- Rev. Similo Sanqela (2024)
- Rev. Lucky M. Mgabhi (2025–present)

== Social Justice and Refugee Advocacy ==
Central Methodist Mission is particularly renowned for its role in providing sanctuary to refugees, especially during the early 2000s when thousands of Zimbabweans fled economic and political instability in their home country. Under Bishop Paul Verryn's leadership, the church opened its doors to those in need, at one point housing over 2,000 refugees in the building. The church became a shelter and sanctuary during the Xenophobic violence in South Africa helping many displaced refugees with social needs.

While praised by many humanitarian organizations, this initiative also brought scrutiny, including concerns about overcrowding, sanitation, and city bylaws. Nonetheless, CMM remained firm in its commitment to social justice, viewing its ministry as an expression of the Methodist principle of "social holiness."

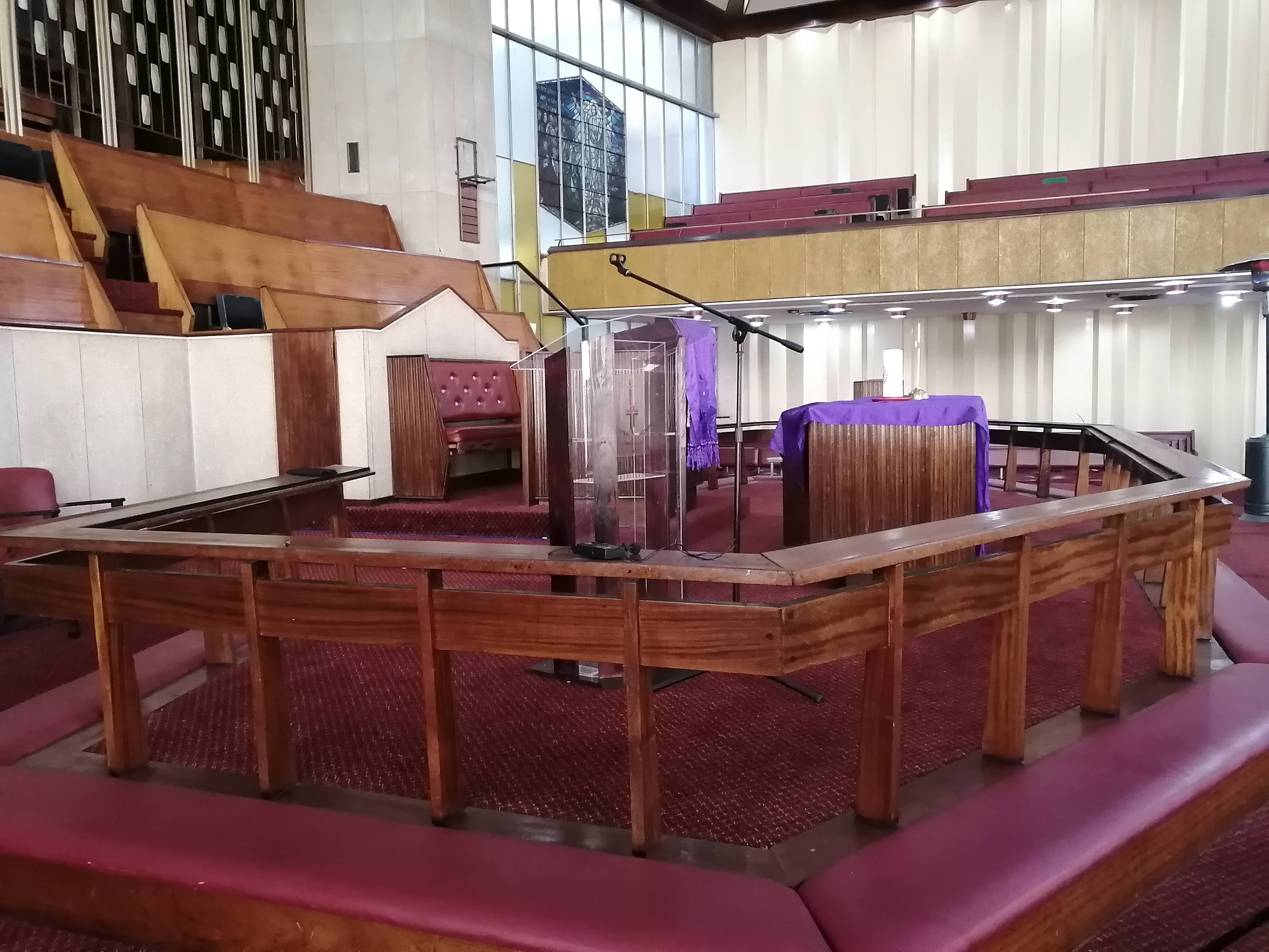
Central Methodist Church

== Mission and Identity ==
CMM identifies itself as a city church committed to the teachings of Jesus Christ and dedicated to building an inclusive, justice-oriented Christian community. Its stated mission is to be a space where all people—regardless of background—can explore faith, experience transformation, and actively pursue the values of God's Kingdom in the world.

== Architecture ==
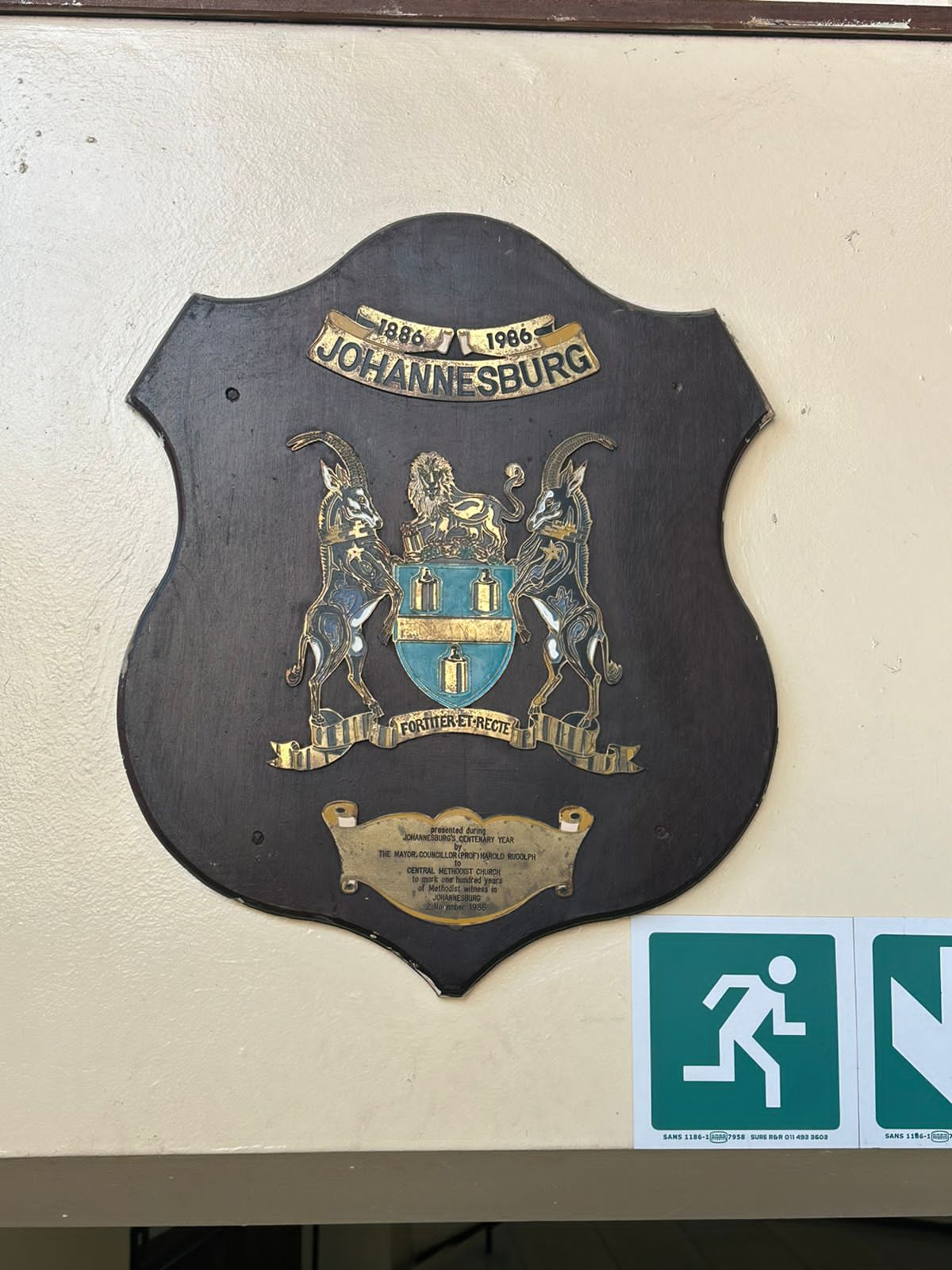
CMM Centenary Commemoration plaque

The current church building, opened in 1967, is a five-storey structure designed in a modernist style. The sanctuary is located on the upper floors, with offices, meeting rooms, and community spaces distributed throughout the building.

The interior sanctuary of the Central Methodist Mission is designed in an octagonal shape, a rare but historically significant architectural form in Methodism. This design places CMM in a lineage of octagonal chapels inspired by the preaching and structural preferences of John Wesley, the founder of Methodism.

Wesley advocated for the octagonal form in some instances due to its practical advantages for preaching, acoustics, and visibility. The shape also allowed for efficient use of space and was symbolic of regeneration and new beginnings.

CMM's design echoes several key examples of early octagonal Methodist chapels, including:

- Yarm Methodist Church (1763) – North Yorkshire, England
- Heptonstall Methodist Church (1764) – West Yorkshire, England
- Chester Octagon Chapel (1765) – Cheshire, England
- Stroud Methodist Chapel (1762) – Gloucestershire, England
- St John's Methodist Church (Arbroath) (1772) – Arbroath, Scotland

These chapels were often constructed to distinguish Methodist worship spaces from Anglican churches and to emphasize the centrality of the pulpit, a hallmark of Wesleyan preaching.

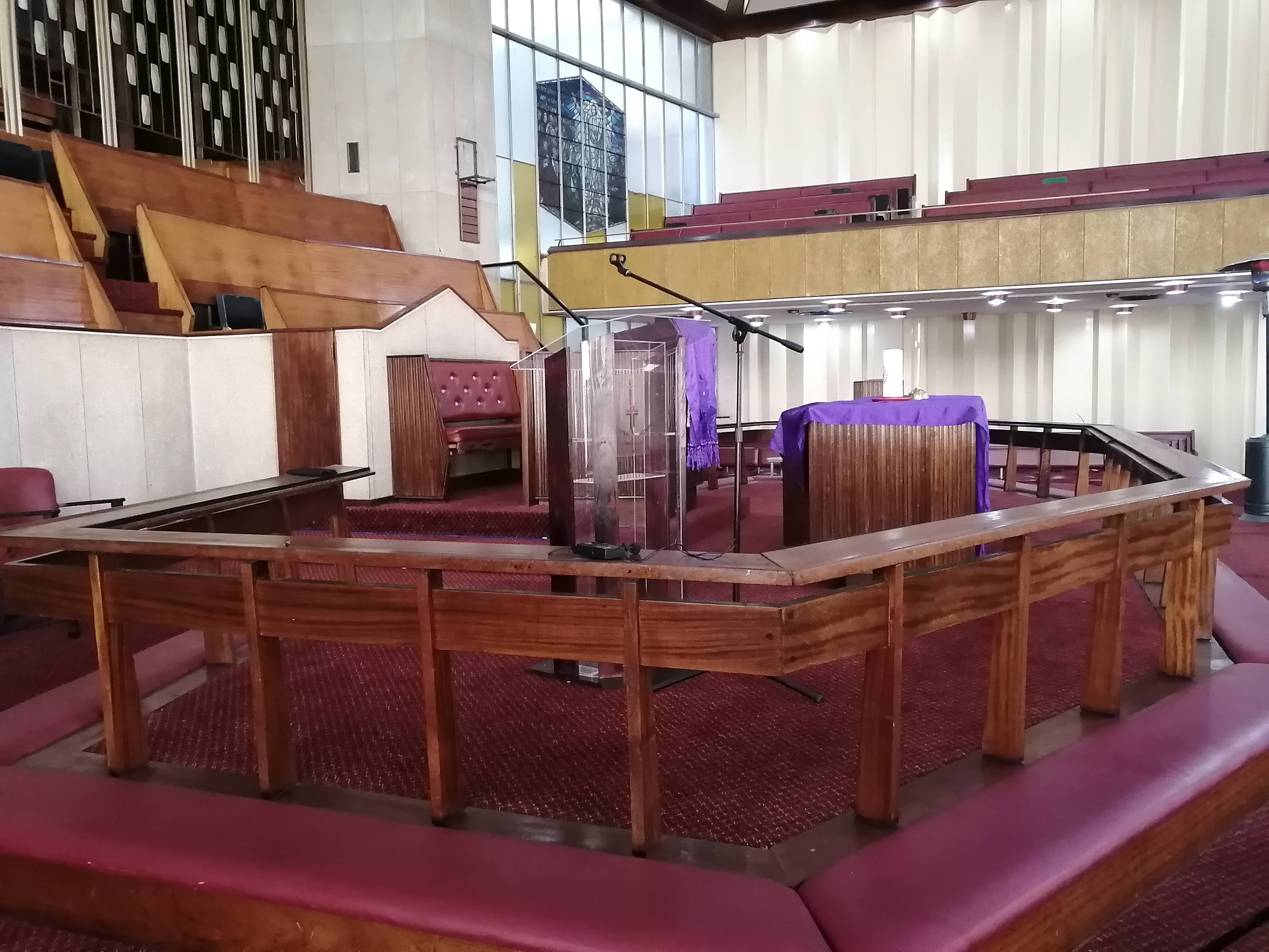
Pulpit and altar at Central Methodist Church

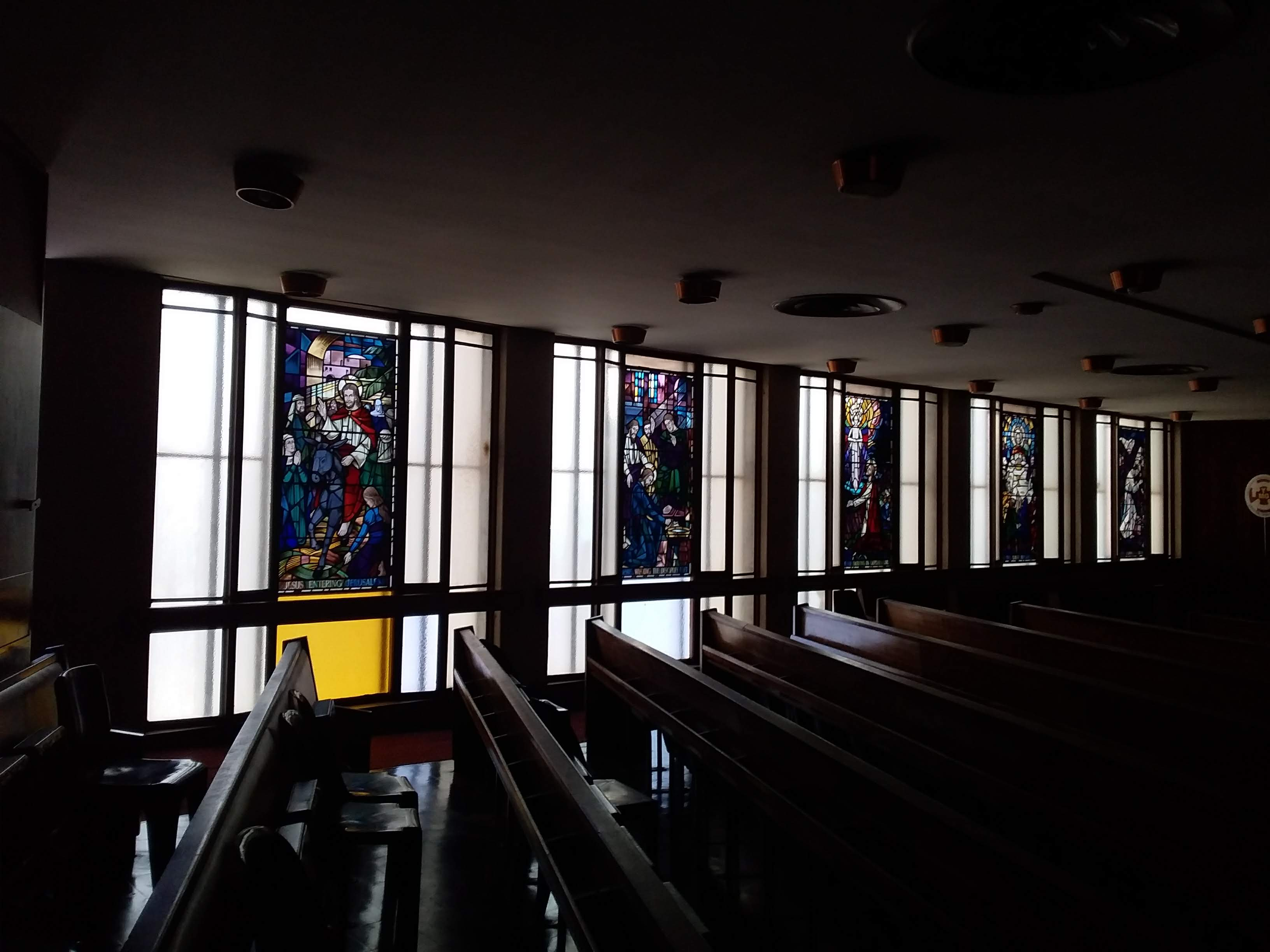
Stained glass at CMM

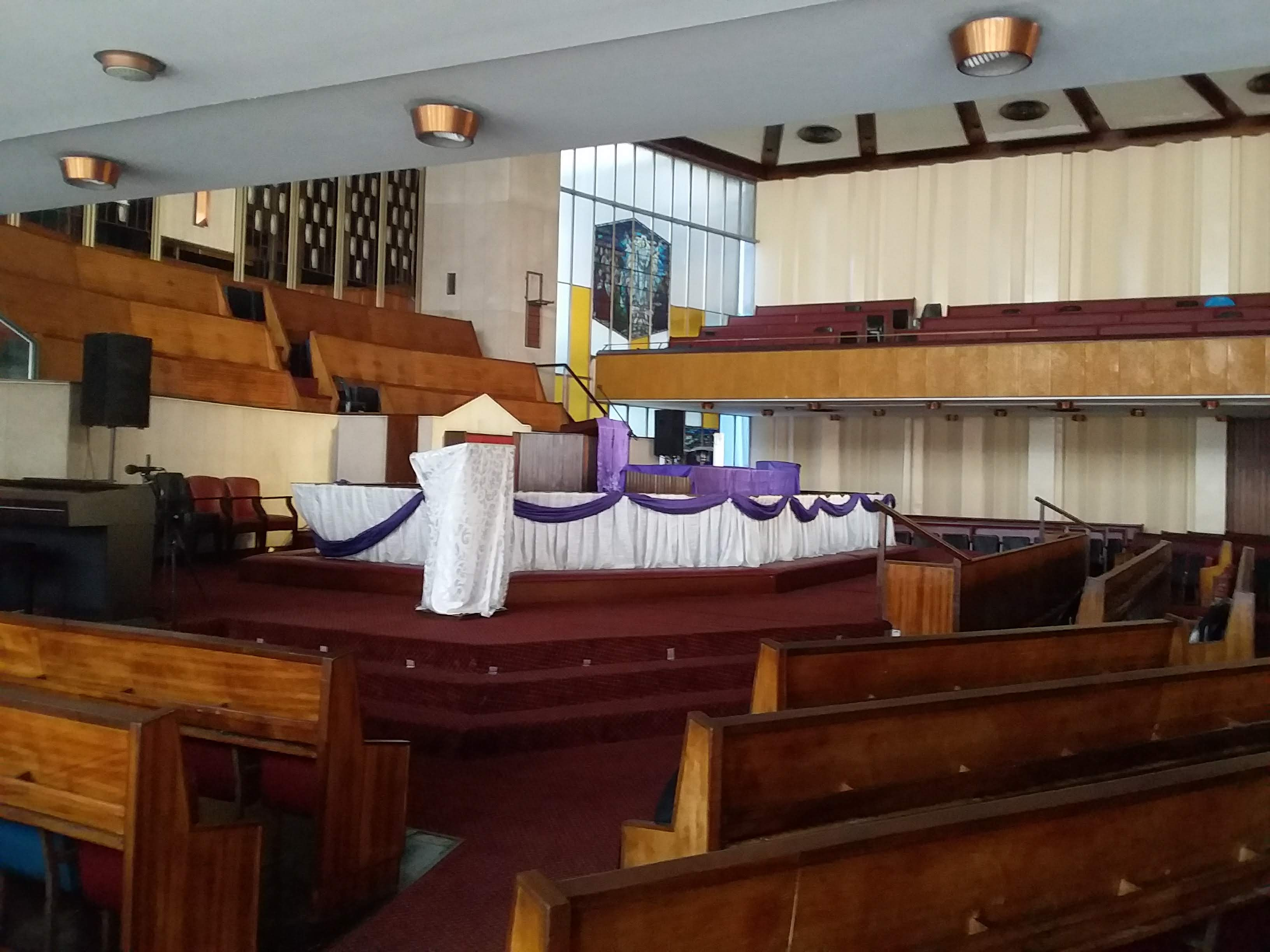
Interior of Central Methodist Church

== Legacy ==
During the apartheid era, the Central Methodist Church served as a meeting place for activists and a vocal proponent of human rights. It also supported liberation theology and actively opposed the segregationist policies of the time, offering a space for prayer, protest, and pastoral care to those targeted by the regime.

The church has also faced numerous challenges, including tension with municipal authorities and internal church debates regarding its unconventional role in civic life. Nevertheless, its legacy is widely recognized as one of radical inclusivity, religious conviction in action, and resistance to social injustice.

CMM remains a landmark institution in Johannesburg, symbolizing the enduring intersection of faith, activism, and community care in South Africa's urban landscape. The church was also used as a venue during the proceedings of the Truth and Reconciliation Commission.
