= Mvume Dandala =

South African politician (born 1951)

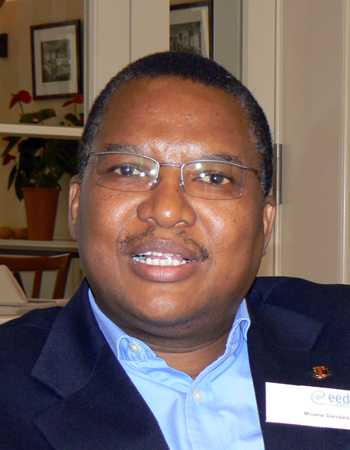
Mvume Dandala

Mvumelwano Mvume Dandala (born 26 October 1951 as Mvumelwano Umdandalaza) is a former presiding bishop of the Methodist Church of Southern Africa and a former head of the All Africa Conference of Churches. He was the presidential candidate of the COPE in the 2009 South African general elections.

== Background ==
Mvume was born on 26 October 1951, the son of the Reverend Killion Dandala, a Methodist minister in the small village of Dandalaville (named after his great-grandfather), in Mount Ayliff in South Africa's Eastern Cape, the last born of four children.

He was a pupil at Ndamase High School, near Umtata before attending the Federal Theological Seminary in Alice where he became the local chairman of the South African Students' Organisation (SASO) where he was involved in the exploration of black and liberation theology and in developing programmes to assist communities with basic amenities such as dams, schools and clinics.

=== 1980s ===
He has an MA in Theology from the University of Cambridge. He became a minister of the Methodist Church of southern Africa (MCSA) in Empangeni, KwaZulu-Natal in 1978, a post he held until 1982.

From 1983 to 1985 he was Superintendent Minister of the North Circuit of the Methodist Church in Port Elizabeth, at the time the largest Circuit of the MCSA. In Port Elizabeth he participated in reconciliation ministries among warring political factions. In July 1985 when South Africa declared a state of emergency he was detained without trial.

From 1986 to 1991 he was General Mission Secretary of the MCSA. At the Missions department, Mvume was instrumental in launching the Malihambe Missions, what was at the time a dangerous policy of sending black and white ministers to work in pairs.

=== 1990s ===
He was superintendent minister of the Central Methodist Mission from 1992 to 1996, during which he convened the Institute for Evangelism both for the Southern African Methodist Churches and later a Pan African Institute for Evangelism for the Methodist churches in Africa held in Nairobi 1994. This culminated in the founding of the Pan African Methodist Leader’s Consultation, which is held bi-annually.

At the Central Methodist Mission, Johannesburg, Mvume’s mediation and conflict resolution skills were in great demand during the preparation for the political transition in the late 'nineties. He found himself having to be at the forefront of helping to reduce violence in order to create an atmosphere where elections could happen peacefully. This led – in the years directly after the elections – to his playing a critical role in the disarmament of the African National Congress's (ANC) Self Defence Units and the Inkatha Freedom Party’s (IFP) Self Protection Units in the Eastern Areas of Johannesburg.

In 1996 Dandala was appointed the Presiding Bishop of the Methodist Church of Southern Africa – the highest office in the church. He was subsequently appointed for two further terms.

In 1998 he was appointed President of the South African Council of Churches and again the following year for a second term in office.

=== 2000s ===
In 2003 the University of Transkei granted him an honorary doctorate in philosophy.

In 2003 he became general secretary of the All Africa Conference of Churches (AACC). His term ended in December 2008.

In May, 2004, he led an AACC delegation to Sudan. His subsequent reportback urged Sudan government to help end hostilities and human rights violations in Darfur, urged the world to keep the whole Sudan in focus beyond Darfur, and said there were strong grounds for investigating and monitoring reports of crime against humanity in Sudan. 1999 to 2009 he was Prior of the Order of St John in South Africa.

He was granted an honorary doctorate in theology from Cameroon's Protestant University in 2005.

== Awards ==
- Bishop John T. Walker Distinguished Humanitarian Services Award (1993) The award is presented annually by Africare, an American non-profit organisation to recognize those whose work has made a significant impact on raising the standard of living in Africa.
- the Methodist Church of Southern Africa Peace Award (1994)
- Rotary’s Paul Harris Fellowship Award for excellence (1994)
- Silver Order of the Grand Counsellor of the Baobab for excellence (2002). The Order of the Baobab is awarded to South African citizens for distinguished service in the fields of business and the economy, science, medicine, and for technological innovation and community service.

== Family ==
Dandala married Phumzile Dandala on 15 December 1973. His son is former Isidingo star Hlomla Dandala who was one of the first celebrities to come out in support of Cope. He also has a daughter, Gqibelo, a banker. His lawyer niece Thobeka was a founding member of the Cope’s leadership institute.

== Presidential candidate of COPE ==
On 20 February 2009, he was announced as Cope's presidential candidate. In June 2010 he resigned from COPE after much in fighting among senior party leaders Mosiuoa Lekota and Mbhazima Shilowa.
