= Winnie Madikizela-Mandela Local Municipality =

- Local municipality
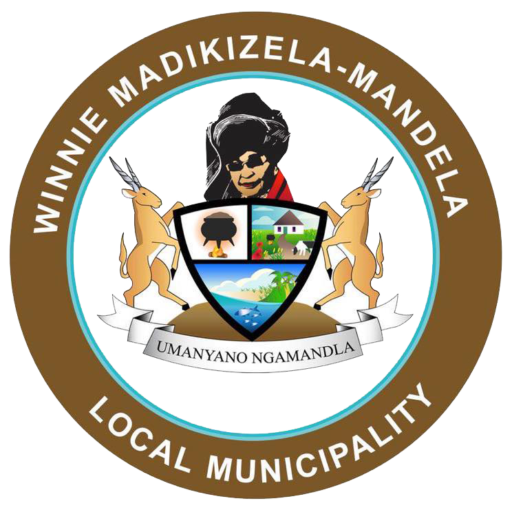
- Seal

- Location in the Eastern Cape
- Coordinates: 31°34′S 29°24′E
- Country: South Africa
- Province: Eastern Cape
- District: Alfred Nzo
- Seat: Bizana
- Wards: 32

Government
  - Type: Municipal council
  - Mayor: Daniswa Mafumbatha (ANC)
  - Speaker: Simphiwe Magini (ANC)
  - Chief Whip: Makhosandile Mpetshwa (ANC)

Area
  - Total: 2,417 km^{2} (933 sq mi)

Population (2011)
  - Total: 281,905
  - Density: 116.6/km^{2} (302.1/sq mi)

Racial makeup (2011)
  - Black African: 99.6%
  - Coloured: 0.2%
  - Indian/Asian: 0.1%
  - White: 0.1%

First languages (2011)
  - Xhosa: 93.8%
  - English: 2.0%
  - Zulu: 1.5%
  - Other: 2.7%
- Time zone: UTC+2 (SAST)
- Municipal code: EC443

Winnie Madikizela-Mandela Municipality (Xhosa: uMasipala wase Winnie Madikizela-Mandela), formerly Mbizana Municipality, is a local municipality within the Alfred Nzo District Municipality, in the Wild Coast Region of the Eastern Cape province of South Africa. It is named after Winnie Madikizela-Mandela, an anti-apartheid activist and wife of President Nelson Mandela.

It was formerly part of the OR Tambo District Municipality, but was transferred to the Alfred Nzo District Municipality after the 2011 municipal election.

== Main places ==
The 2001 census divided the municipality into the following main places:

Place	Code	Area (km^{2})	Population	Most spoken language
Amadiba	23001	433.70	28,421	Xhosa
Amandela	23002	8.78	2,297	Xhosa
Amandengane	23003	46.81	3,583	Xhosa
Amangutyana	23004	286.10	35,871	Xhosa
Amantshangase	23005	108.38	7,104	Xhosa
Amapisi	23006	122.89	9,909	Xhosa
Bala	23007	18.03	3,935	Xhosa
Bizana	23008	23.96	4,110	Xhosa
Imizizi	23009	541.81	67,728	Xhosa
Ntlenzi	23010	360.60	31,706	Xhosa
Ntshamate	23011	15.02	3,706	Xhosa
Isikelo	23012	345.75	41,453	Xhosa
Xesibe	23013	100.00	5,594	Xhosa

== Politics ==
The municipal council consists of sixty-four members elected by mixed-member proportional representation. Thirty-two councillors are elected by first-past-the-post voting in thirty-two wards, while the remaining thirty-two are chosen from party lists so that the total number of party representatives is proportional to the number of votes received. In the election of 1 November 2021 the African National Congress (ANC) won a majority of forty-eight seats on the council. The following table shows the results of the election.

Party	Ward			List			Total seats
Party	Votes	%	Seats	Votes	%	Seats	Total seats
African National Congress	45,160	73.74	32	45,302	74.42	16	48
African Transformation Movement	4,227	6.90	0	4,239	6.96	5	5
Economic Freedom Fighters	4,082	6.66	0	4,300	7.06	4	4
Socialist Party of South Africa	1,470	2.40	0	1,463	2.40	2	2
Democratic Alliance	1,070	1.75	0	1,125	1.85	1	1
Independent candidates	2,111	3.45	0				0
Academic Congress Union	980	1.60	0	988	1.62	1	1
United Democratic Movement	760	1.24	0	882	1.45	1	1
African Independent Congress	86	0.14	0	1,166	1.92	1	1
Socialist Revolutionary Workers Party	526	0.86	0	502	0.82	1	1
African People's Convention	471	0.77	0	457	0.75	0	0
Batho Pele Movement	243	0.40	0	229	0.38	0	0
Pan Africanist Congress of Azania	60	0.10	0	219	0.36	0	0
Total	61,246	100.00	32	60,872	100.00	32	64
Valid votes	61,246	98.27		60,872	97.94		
Invalid/blank votes	1,077	1.73		1,280	2.06		
Total votes	62,323	100.00		62,152	100.00		
Registered voters/turnout	133,323	46.75		133,323	46.62		

== Births ==
Mbizana Local Municipality was the birthplace of:

- Oliver Tambo (1917–1993), born in the village of Nkantolo, South African anti-apartheid politician
- Winnie Madikizela-Mandela (1936-2018), born in the village of Mbhongweni, South African ANC Women's League leader
- Babalo Madikizela, born in the village of Mbhongweni, South African politician & MEC.
- Siphosakhe Ntiya-Ntiya, born in Mandzayoni village, he is a South African football player who. currently play for Sekhukhune United, former senior and junior Kaizer Chiefs player.

== Logos ==
2011 - 2020

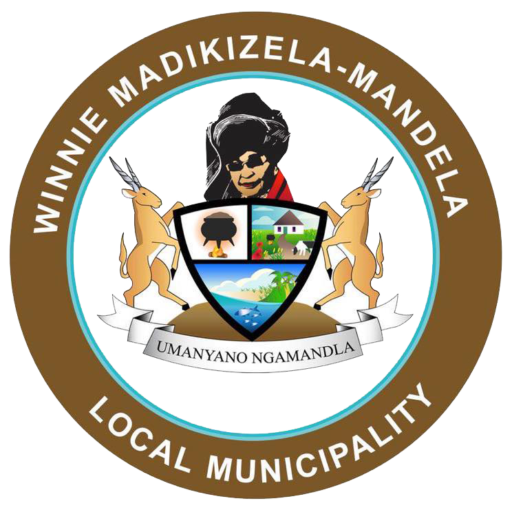
2021–present

== Touristic attractions ==
- Umtamvuna Nature Reserve
- Mbizana Nature Reserve
- OR Tambo Cultural Village
- OR Tambo Monument
- Wild Coast Sun Resort
- Umtentu sanctuary

== Fauna and flora ==
- Ficus bizanae is a Southern African indigenous tree.
