= Paul Verryn =

Methodist minister

The Reverend Paul Verryn
- Bishop of the Central District
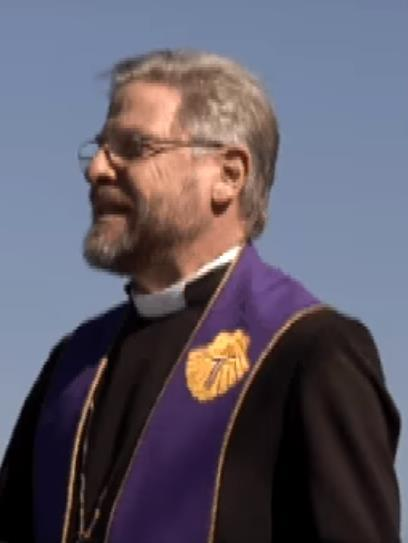
- Verryn c. 2008.
- Church: Methodist Church of Southern Africa
- In office: 1997–2009
- Previous post(s): Minister of the Johannesburg Central Methodist Church

Personal details
- Born: 26 February 1952 (age 73); Pretoria, South Africa
- Education: Rhodes University

Paul Verryn (born 26 February 1952) is an ordained minister of the Methodist Church of Southern Africa. Known for his anti-apartheid activism, he was Bishop of the church's Central District between 1997 and 2009. During that period, he was a prominent and controversial figure for his activism against xenophobia, and clashed with the South African government over his decision to accommodate hundreds of refugees at his Central Methodist Church, Johannesburg city centre.

== Early life ==
Verryn was born on 26 February 1952 in Pretoria, in what is now the Gauteng province of South Africa, and was schooled at St Stithians College, a private Methodist school in Johannesburg. His mother was of German and Irish descent, and his father, who was a supporter of Jan Smuts and fought in World War II, was of Dutch and French descent; his parents separated while he was a child. Come of age under the apartheid state, he was drafted into compulsory military service in 1970. He began studying theology while in the army and in 1976 completed a Bachelor of Divinity at Rhodes University in the Eastern Cape.

== Eastern Cape: 1973–1983 ==
While still a university student, Verryn began working (as a junior minister) in the Methodist churches in the Eastern Cape – first in Uitenhage (1973), and then in Southern Transkei (1974–1975) and Grahamstown (1976–1978). In 1978, he was ordained as a minister of the Methodist Church of Southern Africa (MCSA) in East London, and ministered on the Port Elizabeth circuit from 1979 to 1983. He also chaired Interchurch Aid and the Standards Generating Body for Christian Theology and Ministry, and was involved in the work of the National Cancer Association in the Eastern Cape. He was appointed as MCSA Supervisor of Studies (for student ministers) in 1982, and retained that position until 1997.

Verryn later said that he was "radicalised" during his time in the Eastern Cape, and became involved in anti-apartheid activism: he frequently visited neighbouring townships, sheltered activists from the security police, worked with activist Molly Blackburn, and launched the Port Elizabeth branch of the Detainees Parent Support Committee (DPSC). DPSC primarily assisted the families of activists detained without trial under the Terrorism Act, and Verryn was its Port Elizabeth chair between 1982 and 1983.

Subsequent studies of Verryn's ministry have associated him with liberation theology. He has cited among his influences other progressive South African clergymen with a concern for social justice, such as Beyers Naudé, Peter Storey and Mvume Dandala.

== Orlando, Soweto: 1988–1997 ==
In 1984, Verryn returned to his home region, the Transvaal, to serve the Roodepoort circuit. In December 1987, under the direction of his earlier inspiration Bishop Storey, he moved to the Methodist Church in Orlando West, Soweto, outside Johannesburg. Unusually for a white minister in Soweto, Verryn lived among his congregation in the church's manse, where he continued to shelter activists and to work with the DPSC. Storey later said that Verryn "won the hearts of the Soweto community through his identification with their struggle". When apartheid ended in 1994, Verryn continued his work in Orlando West, and taught divinity at the MCSA seminary, the John Wesley College, from 1994 to 1997.

In 1994 he also assumed the position of:

- Chair of the South African College for Teacher Education
- Convenor of the Training Programme (Phase 1) for Methodist ministers
- Superintendent of the Soweto Community Centre.

=== Stompie Seipei ===
In 1989 a media furor erupted following the abduction of four youths and the murder of James Seipei, also known as Stompie Sepei. Verryn had provided accommodation as a place of safety at the Orlando Mission house (Manse) for the four. At the time this was also his residence as the minister for the Soweto Circuit. Verryn was then also prominent as one of Winnie Madikizela-Mandela's critics.

On 29 December 1988 the Mandela United Football Club (MUFC) abducted the four boys from the Mission house. The MUFC was a private force of bodyguards, who answered to and were controlled by Winnie Madikizela-Mandela, then Nelson Mandela's wife and a leading anti-apartheid activist. Following the abduction, Madikizela-Mandela alleged that Verryn had been abusing the boys sexually. Some of the boys initially supported the allegation, but later retracted their statements, saying that the MUFC members had forced them to support the claim. Madikizela-Mandela also claimed that Seipei (Moeketsi) was a police informer, a charge which in those days could have resulted in mob execution of the accused. Seipei's body was found on 6 January 1989, dumped on waste ground in Soweto. The Truth and Reconciliation Commission found that the purpose of the abduction had been to force the boys to accuse Verryn of sexual abuse, and, after hearing testimony from all surviving witnesses and accusers, specifically cleared Verryn of any charges of sexual abuse.

== Johannesburg: 1997–2014 ==
In 1997, Verryn was consecrated as Bishop of the MCSA's Central District, which traverses three South African provinces and accounts for almost half of MCSA's total membership. In the same year, Verryn began serving as a minister on the Johannesburg circuit; he was superintendent minister at the Central Methodist Mission, Johannesburg on Pritchard Street.

=== The Zimbabwean refugee crisis ===
The Central Methodist Mission, Johannesburg, under the leadership of Bishop Paul Verryn, had established a tradition of ministering to the poor and marginalised in the city centre. When the flow of Zimbabwean refugees into South Africa had been significantly reduced, the South African government removed special controls which it had been forced to put in place. However, refugees and illegal immigrants continued to enter the country in relatively limited numbers, mostly from Zimbabwe. Many of them were destitute and jobless as well as being homeless. Over the objections of some of his church members, Verryn offered Johannesburg Central Methodist Church to this need. The steady inflow of refugees soon filled the church, which lacking all suitable facilities, nevertheless accommodated over 1500 refugees who slept on the pews and the floors; anywhere they could find a space.

In 2008 the South African Police raided the church in search of illegal immigrants. About 1500 people were held, in most cases temporarily. During 2008 and continuing into 2009 an increasing tide of resentment (labelled "xenophobia" by the media) against these foreigners peaked and broke out into anti-foreigner riots. Many Zimbabwean immigrants (whether legal or illegal), together with Mozambicans, Malawians, Taiwanese and others from any other African country became victims of the violence, losing lives, businesses, jobs and families. The need for a place of safety for Zimbabwean (and other) refugees became urgent. The Zimbabwean refugee ark of Johannesburg Central Methodist Church began to burst at the seams. During the later part of 2008 the police found it necessary to guard the refugees with shotgun armed officers.

Verryn requested the Johannesburg city authorities to provide for the refugees, but at the same time refused to allow immigration authorities to enter the sanctuary of the church to identify illegal immigrants. Early in 2009 the local municipality began to make plans to alleviate the situation at the church.

Meanwhile, inevitably, thefts, fights and assaults occurred among the refugees. Several young girls claimed that they had been raped, or sexually abused. In the latter part of 2009, once again Verryn was accused of abusing children and/or young women among the refugees. An exhaustive investigation by the media revealed no evidence whatever to substantiate the accusations against him. All of the girls who had claimed rape or sexual assault identified men other than Verryn as the guilty ones. The medical staff of Médecins sans Frontières, who by now also worked among the refugees, stated that they had treated only one girl for rape, and that this attack had not taken place at the church. In December, a group of 35 civil society organisations – including the South African Council of Churches, South African Municipal Workers' Union, the Treatment Action Campaign, the Congress of South African Trade Unions, and the South African branches of Amnesty International and Human Rights Watch – commended Verryn's efforts as "in the spirit called for from all of us by our Constitution", but said that the situation at the church was "not sustainable" and called for the government to respond to Verryn's longstanding calls for humanitarian assistance.

=== Suspension ===
In December 2009, Verryn resigned as Bishop and was replaced by Peter Witbooi, but retained his ministry at the Central Methodist Church. However, on 19 January 2010, MCSA suspended Verryn, following an internal disciplinary investigation and pending a formal disciplinary hearing. The charges were not disclosed, but the announcement followed reports of tensions between Verryn and MCSA's Presiding Bishop Ivan Abrahams. It was later clarified that there were two charges against Verryn, both implying that he had transgressed the bounds of his authority. The first charge concerned legal proceedings instituted by Verryn in December 2009 to appoint a curator ad litem to represent the interests of unaccompanied minors living at his church; Verryn had allegedly instituted these proceedings without proper authority. The second charge related to media statements which Verryn had allegedly made even after MCSA had instructed him not to.

Verryn disputed both charges, but said, "I will find another way of working with the poor, with or without the church. They have become my companions." In the end, the charges were never heard in a disciplinary hearing; the charges were dropped in early May 2010 on a technicality (apprehension of bias), and Verryn was reinstated.

== Jabavu, Soweto: 2015–2022 ==
Verryn gave his last Sunday church service at the Central Methodist Church on 28 December 2014, and vacated the ministry at the end of the year. Verryn was replaced by Reverend Ndumiso Ngcobo, under whom MCSA hoped to return the church "to a state of worship rather than of refuge". As a result, those living in the church – Verryn estimated that there were 460 on Christmas Eve – were asked to vacate by the end of the year. Verryn denied that he had been pressured into leaving the church, saying, "This is a decision I made under no external pressure whatsoever but I felt the time is right to move on to something different and new. It’s been a huge part of my life for a long time but I’m not bereft. A season comes and a season goes." The Guardian reported that the church had accommodated more than 30,000 refugees over Verryn's tenure.

It was reported that Verryn would move to the Jabavu circuit in Soweto. He became superintendent of a Methodist community centre in Soweto, called the Tsietsi Mashinini Community Centre, whose work he had been involved in since 1987. He continued his activism through the community centre, where about 100 migrant families lived as of 2022, and through Peace Action, a non-governmental organisation which he founded in 2010 to monitor and document violence against foreign nationals in South Africa. As of 2016 he was member of the council of St Stithians College, his former high school.
