= Fred Bridgland =

British writer and biographer

Fred Bridgland is a British writer and biographer. During the Angolan Civil War, he wrote about South Africa's involvement in Angola and in the 1990s he revealed human rights abuses committed by UNITA rebels under the command of Jonas Savimbi. Critics have derided his biography of Savimbi, Jonas Savimbi: A Key to Africa, as the work of an apologist. Bridgland has denied this claim in interviews, saying rather he was just a biographer.

Bridgland has written a number of books, including:

- The War for Africa: Twelve Months That Transformed a Continent
- Jonas Savimbi: A Key to Africa (1986)
- Katiza's Journey
- Truth, Lies and Alibis: A Winnie Mandela story
- The Guerrilla and the Journalist: Exploring the Murderous Legacy of Jonas Savimbi (Johannesburg: Delta, 2022)
