= Winnie Mandela =

South African activist and politician (1936–2018)

The Honourable Winnie Mandela OLS MP
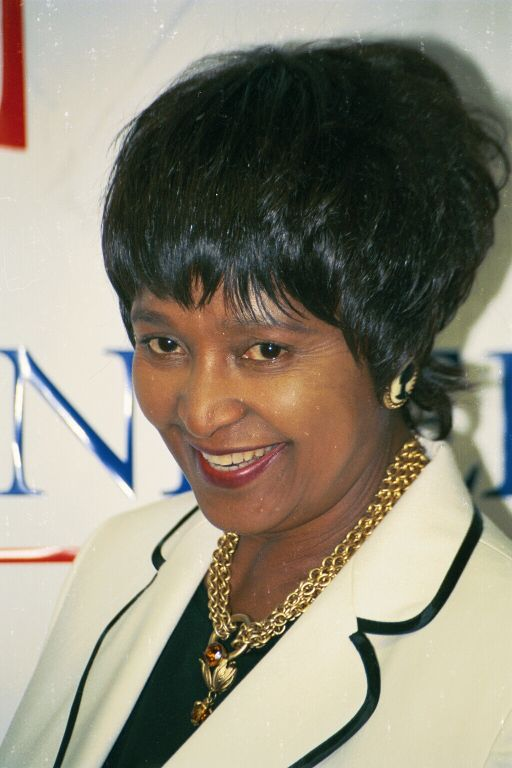
- Mandela in 1996

Member of the National Assembly of South Africa
- In office 9 April 2009 – 2 April 2018
- In office April 1994 – 2003
- Constituency: Eastern Cape

Deputy Minister of Arts, Culture, Science and Technology
- In office 11 May 1994 – 31 August 1996
- President: Nelson Mandela
- Minister: Ben Ngubane
- Preceded by: Position established
- Succeeded by: Pallo Jordan; Derek Hanekom

2nd President of the African National Congress Women's League
- In office 1993–2003
- Preceded by: Gertrude Shope
- Succeeded by: Nosiviwe Mapisa-Nqakula

Personal details
- Born: Nomzamo Winifred Zanyiwe Madikizela; 26 September 1936 Mbhongweni, South Africa
- Died: 2 April 2018 (aged 81) Johannesburg, South Africa
- Resting place: Fourways Memorial Park Cemetery
- Party: African National Congress
- Spouse: Nelson Mandela (m. 1958; div. 1996)
- Children: Zenani; Zindziswa
- Education: Jan H. Hofmeyr School of Social Work; University of the Witwatersrand
- Occupation: Politician; social worker; anti-apartheid activist

Nomzamo Winifred Zanyiwe Madikizela-Mandela (born Nomzamo Winifred Zanyiwe Madikizela; 26 September 1936 – 2 April 2018), also known as Winnie Mandela, was a South African politician and anti-apartheid activist who was the second wife of Nelson Mandela. During her political career, she served as a Member of Parliament from 1994 to 2003, and from 2009 until her death, and was a deputy minister of arts and culture from 1994 to 1996. A member of the African National Congress (ANC) political party, she served on the ANC's National Executive Committee and headed its Women's League. Madikizela-Mandela was known to her supporters as the "Mother of the Nation".

Born in Bizana, and a qualified social worker, she married anti-apartheid activist Nelson Mandela in Johannesburg in 1958; they remained married for 38 years and had two children together. In 1963, after Mandela was imprisoned following the Rivonia Trial, she became his public face during the 27 years he spent in jail. During that period, she rose to prominence within the domestic anti-apartheid movement. Madikizela-Mandela was detained by apartheid state security services on various occasions, tortured, subjected to banning orders, and banished to a rural town, and she spent several months in solitary confinement.

In the mid-1980s, Madikizela-Mandela exerted a "reign of terror", and was "at the centre of an orgy of violence" in Soweto, which led to condemnation by the anti-apartheid movement in South Africa, and a rebuke by the ANC in exile. During this period, her home was burned down by residents of Soweto. The Truth and Reconciliation Commission (TRC) established by Nelson Mandela's government to investigate human rights abuses found Madikizela-Mandela to have been "politically and morally accountable for the gross violations of human rights committed by the Mandela United Football Club", her security detail. Madikizela-Mandela endorsed the necklacing of alleged police informers and apartheid government collaborators, and her security detail carried out kidnapping, torture, and murder, most notoriously the killing of 14-year-old Stompie Seipei whose kidnapping she was convicted of.

Nelson Mandela was released from prison on 11 February 1990, and the couple separated in 1992; their divorce was finalised in March 1996. She visited him during his final illness. As a senior ANC figure, she took part in the post-apartheid ANC government, although she was dismissed from her post amid allegations of corruption. In 2003, Madikizela-Mandela was convicted of theft and fraud, and she temporarily withdrew from active politics before returning several years later. Her biography Winnie Mandela: A life was written by Anné Mariè du Preez Bezdrob and published in 2003.

== Early life and education ==
Madikizela-Mandela's Xhosa name was Nomzamo. She was born in the village of Mbhongweni, Bizana, Pondoland, in what is now the Eastern Cape province. She was the fifth of nine children, seven sisters and a brother. Her parents, Columbus and Gertrude, who had a white father and Xhosa mother, were both teachers. Columbus was a history teacher and a headmaster, and Gertrude was a domestic science teacher. Madikizela-Mandela went on to become the head girl at her high school in Bizana.

Upon leaving school, she went to Johannesburg to study social work at the Jan Hofmeyr School of Social Work. She earned a degree in social work in 1956, and decades later earned a bachelor's degree in international relations from the University of the Witwatersrand.

She held a number of jobs in various parts of what was then the Bantustan of Transkei; including with the Transkei government, living at various points of time at Bizana, Shawbury and Johannesburg. Her first job was as a social worker at Baragwanath Hospital in Soweto.

== Marriage to Nelson Mandela ==
Madikizela met lawyer and anti-apartheid activist Nelson Mandela in 1957, when he was still married to Evelyn Mase. She was 22 years old and standing at a bus stop in Soweto when Mandela first saw her and charmed her, securing a lunch date the following week. The couple married in 1958 and had two daughters, Zenani (born 1959) and Zindziswa (born 1960). Mandela was arrested and jailed in 1963 and was not released until 1990.

The couple separated in 1992. They finalised their divorce in March 1996 with an unspecified out-of-court settlement. During the divorce hearing, Nelson Mandela rejected Madikizela-Mandela's assertion that arbitration could salvage the marriage, and cited her infidelity as a cause of the divorce, saying "... I am determined to get rid of the marriage". Her attempt to obtain a settlement up to US $5million (R70 million) – half of what she claimed her ex-husband was worth – was dismissed when she failed to appear in court for a settlement hearing.

When asked in a 1994 interview about the possibility of reconciliation, she said: "I am not fighting to be the country's First Lady. In fact, I am not the sort of person to carry beautiful flowers and be an ornament to everyone."

Madikizela-Mandela was involved in a lawsuit at the time of her death, claiming that she was entitled to Mandela's homestead in Qunu, through customary law, despite her divorce from Nelson Mandela in 1996. Her case was dismissed by the Mthatha High Court in 2016, and she was reportedly preparing to appeal to the Constitutional Court at the time of her death, after failing at the Supreme Court of Appeal in January 2018.

== Apartheid: 1963–1985 ==
Winnie Mandela emerged as a leading opponent of apartheid during the latter part of her husband's imprisonment. Due to her political activities, she was regularly detained by the National Party government. She was subjected to house arrest, kept under surveillance, imprisoned, and banished to the remote town of Brandfort.

Her longest jailing was for 491 days (as noted in her account 491 Days: Prisoner Number 1323/69), beginning on 12 May 1969, at Pretoria Central Prison, where she spent months in solitary confinement, and was tortured and beaten. By her own account, her experience in prison "hardened" her.

From 1977 to 1985, she was banished to the town of Brandfort in the Orange Free State and confined to the area. It was at this time that she became well known in the Western world. She organised a creche with a non-governmental organization, Operation Hunger and a clinic in Brandfort with Dr Abu Baker Asvat, her personal physician, campaigned actively for equal rights and was promoted by the ANC as a symbol of their struggle against apartheid. While in exile in Brandfort, she, and those who attempted to assist her, were harassed by the apartheid police.

In a leaked letter to Jacob Zuma in October 2008, outgoing President of South Africa Thabo Mbeki alluded to the role the ANC had created for Nelson and Winnie Mandela, as representative symbols of the brutality of apartheid:

In the context of the global struggle for the release of political prisoners in our country, our movement took a deliberate decision to profile Nelson Mandela as the representative personality of these prisoners, and therefore to use his personal political biography, including the persecution of his wife, Winnie Mandela, dramatically to present to the world and the South African community the brutality of the apartheid system.

Beaten by the apartheid police, she developed an addiction to painkillers and alcohol as a result of a back injury caused by the assault.

== Violence and criminal proceedings ==
During a speech in Munsieville on 13 April 1986, Madikizela-Mandela endorsed the practice of necklacing (burning people alive using rubber tyres filled with petrol) by saying: "With our boxes of matches and our necklaces we shall liberate this country." Further tarnishing her reputation were accusations by her bodyguard, Jerry Musivuzi Richardson, and others, at the Truth and Reconciliation Commission, that she had ordered kidnapping and murder during the second half of the 1980s.

=== Return to Soweto and Mandela United Football Club: 1986–1989 ===
Madikizela-Mandela returned to Soweto from Brandfort in late 1985, in defiance of a banning order. During her banishment, the United Democratic Front (UDF) and Congress of South African Trade Unions (Cosatu) had formed a mass-movement against apartheid. The new organisations relied more heavily on collective decision-making structures, rather than on individual charisma. She took a more militaristic approach, eschewing the approach of the newer bodies, and began dressing in military garb, and surrounding herself with bodyguards: the Mandela United Football Club (MUFC). Living in Madikizela-Mandela's home, the putative "soccer team" began hearing family disputes and delivering "judgments" and "sentences", and eventually became associated with kidnapping, torture and murder. She was implicated in at least 15 deaths during this time period.

In 1988, Madikizela-Mandela's home was burned by high school students in Soweto, in retaliation for the actions of the Mandela United Football Club. By 1989, after appeals from local residents, and after the Seipei kidnapping, the UDF (in the guise of the Mass Democratic Movement, or MDM), "disowned" her for "violating human rights ... in the name of the struggle against apartheid". The ANC in exile issued a statement criticising her judgment after she refused to heed instructions issued from prison by Nelson Mandela to dissociate herself from the Football Club and after attempts at mediation by an ANC crisis committee failed.

==== Lolo Sono and Siboniso Shabalala ====
In November 1988, 21-year-old Lolo Sono, and his 19-year-old friend Siboniso Shabalala, disappeared in Soweto. Sono's father said he saw his son in a kombi with Madikizela-Mandela, and that his son had been badly beaten. Sono’s mother claimed that Madikizela-Mandela had labelled her son a spy, and had said she was "taking him away". At the subsequent Truth and Reconciliation Commission hearings, Sono's stepmother said, fighting back tears, "I am pleading with Mrs Mandela today, in front of the whole world, that please, Mrs Mandela, give us our son back. Even if Lolo is dead, let Mrs Mandela give us the remains of our son, so that we must bury him decently. Then after, maybe, we can rest assured knowing that Lolo is buried here." Sono and Shabalala's bodies were exhumed from pauper's graves in Soweto's Avalon Cemetery in 2013, by the National Prosecuting Authority's Missing People's Task Team, having been stabbed soon after their abductions.

==== Seipei and Asvat killings ====
On 29 December 1988, Jerry Richardson, who was "coach" of the Mandela United Football Club, abducted 14-year-old James Seipei (also known as Stompie Moeketsi) and three other youths from the home of Methodist minister Paul Verryn, with Richardson claiming that Madikizela-Mandela had the youths taken to her home because she suspected the minister was sexually abusing them (allegations that were baseless). The four were beaten to get them to admit to having had sex with the minister. Negotiations that lasted 10 days, by senior ANC and community leaders to get the kidnapped boys released by Madikizela-Mandela failed. Seipei was accused of being an informer, and his body later found in a field with stab wounds to the throat on 6 January 1989.

In 1991, Mrs Mandela was acquitted of all but the kidnapping of Seipei. A key witness, Katiza Cebekhulu, who was going to testify that Madikizela-Mandela had killed Sepei, had been tortured and kidnapped to Zambia by her supporters prior to the trial, to prevent him testifying against her. Her six-year jail sentence was reduced to a fine on appeal.

In 1992, she was accused of ordering the murder of Abu Baker Asvat, a family friend and prominent Soweto doctor, who had examined Seipei at Mandela's house, after Seipei had been abducted but before he had been killed. Mandela's role in the Asvat killing was later probed as part of the Truth and Reconciliation Commission hearings in 1997. Asvat's murderer testified that she paid the equivalent of $8,000 and supplied the firearm used in the killing, which took place on 27 January 1989. The hearings were later adjourned amid claims that witnesses were being intimidated on Madikizela-Mandela's orders.

In a 2017 documentary about the life and activism of Madikizela-Mandela, former Soweto police officer Henk Heslinga alleged that former safety minister Sydney Mufamadi had instructed him to re-open the investigation into the death of Seipei, as well as all other cases made against Madikizela-Mandela, for the purpose of charging Winnie with murder. According to Heslinga, Richardson admitted during an interview that Seipei discovered he was an informant, and that he killed the child to cover his tracks. However, at a press conference a few days after Madikizela-Mandela's funeral, Mufamadi denied the allegations in the documentary, stating that Helsinga's statements were false. The documentary had previously been described by in a review by Vanity Fair as "unabashedly one-sided" and "overwhelmingly defensive". Commentator Max du Preez, called the decision by television station eNCA to broadcast the documentary in the week prior to Madikizela-Mandela's funeral without context a "serious mistake", and he described it as making "outrageous claims", while former TRC commissioner Dumisa Ntsebeza questioned the motives of the documentary maker.

In January 2018, ANC MP Mandla, Nelson Mandela's grandson by his first wife, Evelyn Mase, called for Madikizela-Mandela's role in the Asvat and Seipei murders to be probed. In October 2018 a new biography of Madikizela-Mandela concluded that she had been responsible for the murder of Asvat.

In April 2018, Joyce Seipei, the mother of Stompie Seipei, told media that she did not believe that Winnie Madikizela-Mandela was involved in her son’s murder. In a subsequent interview with UK paper The Independent, Joyce Seipei said that she had forgiven Madikizela-Mandela, and that during the TRC hearings, Madikizela-Mandela had told her, in the context of her son Stompie's murder: "...may God forgive me". After the TRC hearings, Madikizela-Mandela had provided financial support to Joyce Sepei's family, and Seipei's home was furnished by the ANC.

=== TRC findings ===
The final report of the Truth and Reconciliation commission (TRC), issued in 1998, found "Ms Winnie Madikizela Mandela politically and morally accountable for the gross violations of human rights committed by the Mandela United Football Club" and that she "was responsible, by omission, for the commission of gross violations of human rights." The TRC report also stated that the abduction to Zambia of the Sepei trial witness Katiza Cebekhulu, where he was detained without trial for almost 3 years by the Kenneth Kaunda government before moving to the UK, was done by the ANC and in the "interests" of Madikizela-Mandela. The TRC found allegations against Methodist minister Paul Verryn to be "unfounded and without any merit" and that "Madikizela-Mandela deliberately and maliciously slandered Verryn...in an attempt to divert attention away from herself and [her] associates...". The TRC also found that she was responsible for the abduction of, and assaults on, Stompie Sepei, and that she had attempted to cover up his death by claiming he had fled to Botswana. She was found by the TRC to be responsible for the 1988 disappearance of Lolo Sono and Siboniso Shabalala.

== Transition to democracy: 1990–2003 ==
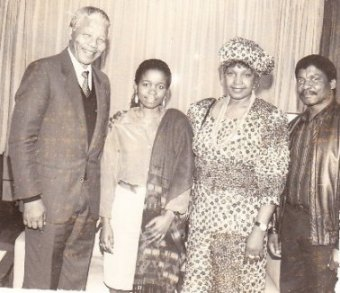
Winnie Mandela with Nelson Mandela, Alberto Chissano and his daughter Cidalia in Museu Galeria Chissano, Mozambique, 1990

During South Africa's transition to multi-racial democracy, she adopted a far less conciliatory attitude to White South Africans and was considered to be as controversial as her husband was before his arrest. She was seen on her husband's arm when he was released in February 1990, the first time the couple had been seen in public for nearly 30 years.

Their 38-year marriage ended in April 1992 after rumours of unfaithfulness. Their divorce was finalised in March 1996. She then adopted the surname "Madikizela-Mandela". Also in 1992, she lost her position as the head of the ANC social welfare department, amid allegations of corruption.

Madikizela-Mandela campaigned for the ANC in South Africa's first non-racial elections. Appointed Deputy Minister of Arts, Culture, Science and Technology in May 1994, she was dismissed 11 months later following allegations of corruption.

In 1995, prominent members of the ANC Women's League, including Adelaide Tambo resigned from the National Executive Committee of that body because of disagreement with Madikizela-Mandela's leadership of the body and amid a controversy about a large donation from Pakistani politician Benazir Bhutto that was not handed over to the League by Madikizela-Mandela.

She remained extremely popular amongst many African National Congress (ANC) supporters. In December 1993 and April 1997, she was elected president of the ANC Women's League, although she withdrew her candidacy for ANC Deputy President at the movement's Mafikeng conference in December 1997. Earlier in 1997, she appeared before the Truth and Reconciliation Commission. Archbishop Desmond Tutu as chairman of the commission recognised her importance in the anti-apartheid struggle but exhorted her to apologise and to admit her mistakes. In a guarded response, she admitted "things went horribly wrong".

During the 1990s, she associated with the Israeli mafia operating in South Africa, which was involved in extorting the local Jewish community, and other criminal activity.

In 2002, Madikizela-Mandela was found guilty by a Parliamentary ethics committee of failing to disclose donations and financial interests. Madikizela-Mandela was often absent from Parliament, sometimes for months at a time and was ordered by Parliament to account for her absences in 2003.

== Withdrawal from politics: 2003–2007 ==
In 2003, Madikizela-Mandela offered to act as a human shield prior to the 2003 invasion of Iraq. Also in 2003, she helped defuse a hostage situation at Wits University, where a student who was in arrears with fees took a staff member hostage at knifepoint.

On 24 April 2003, Madikizela-Mandela was convicted on 435 counts of fraud and 25 of theft, and her broker, Addy Moolman, was convicted on 58 counts of fraud and 25 of theft. Both had pleaded not guilty. The charges related to money taken from loan applicants' accounts for a funeral fund, but from which the applicants did not benefit. Madikizela-Mandela was sentenced to five years in prison. Shortly after the conviction, she resigned from all leadership positions in the ANC, including her parliamentary seat and the presidency of the ANC Women's League.

In July 2004, an appeal judge of the Pretoria High Court ruled that "the crimes were not committed for personal gain". The judge overturned the conviction for theft, but upheld the one for fraud, handing her a three years and six months suspended sentence.

== Return to politics ==
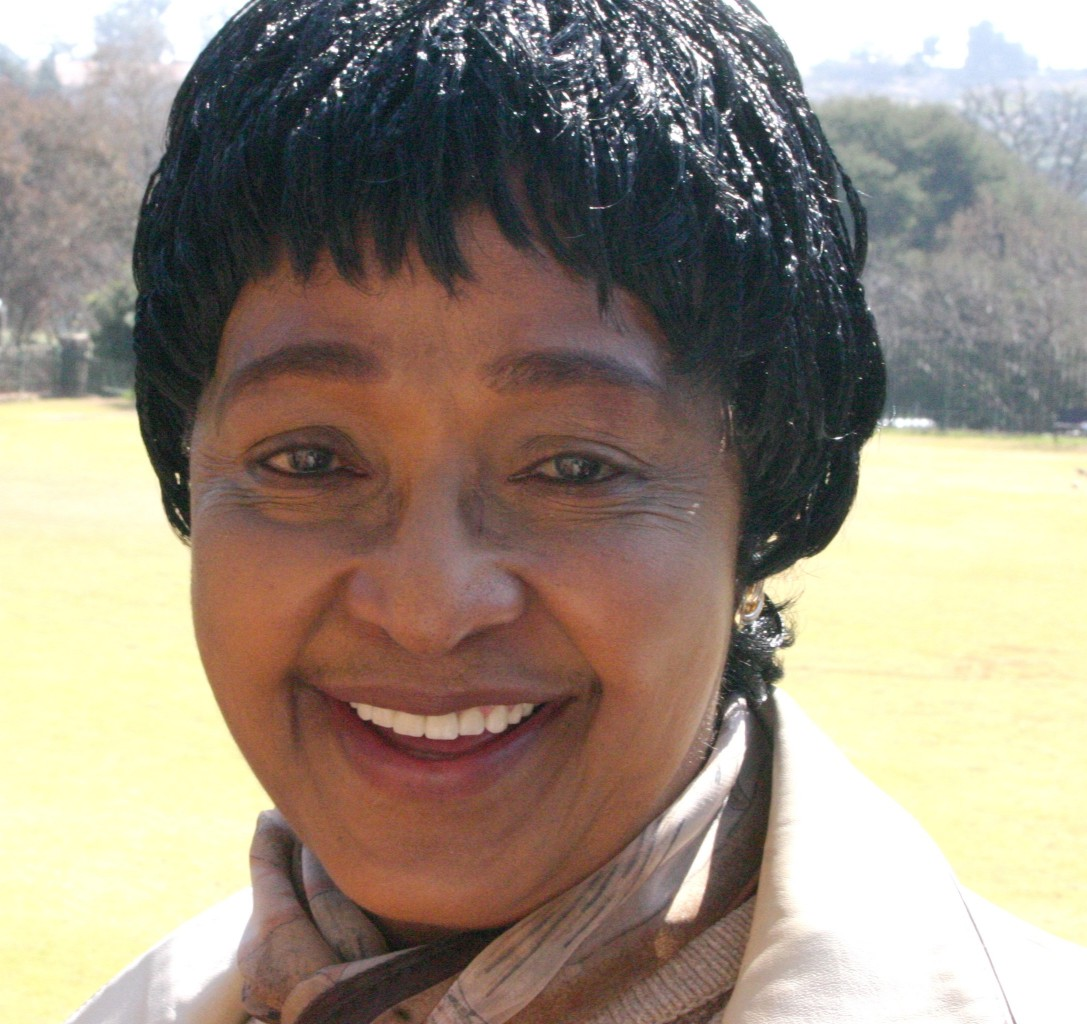
Madikizela-Mandela in 2008

When the ANC announced the election of its National Executive Committee on 21 December 2007, Madikizela-Mandela placed first with 2,845 votes.

Madikizela-Mandela criticised the anti-immigrant violence in May–June 2008 that began in Johannesburg and spread throughout the country and blamed the government's lack of suitable housing provisions for the sentiments behind the riots. She apologised to the victims of the riots and visited the Alexandra township. She offered her home as shelter for an immigrant family from the Democratic Republic of the Congo. She warned that the perpetrators of the violence could strike at the Gauteng train system.

Madikizela-Mandela secured fifth place on the ANC's electoral list for the 2009 general election, behind party president Jacob Zuma, President of South Africa Kgalema Motlanthe, Deputy President Baleka Mbete, and Finance Minister Trevor Manuel. An article in The Observer suggested her position near the top of the list indicated that the party's leadership saw her as a valuable asset in the election with regard to solidifying support among the party's grassroots and the poor.

Madkizela-Mandela was largely sidelined by the ANC in the post-apartheid period. Despite her status as an ANC MP over much of that period, she largely associated with non-ANC figures including Bantu Holomisa and Julius Malema. Madikizela-Mandela was a political patron of Malema, who was expelled from the ANC and later formed his own party, the Economic Freedom Fighters.

=== 2010 interview with Nadira Naipaul ===
In 2010, Madikizela-Mandela was interviewed by Nadira Naipaul. In the interview, she attacked her ex-husband, claiming that he had "let blacks down", that he was only "wheeled out to collect money", and that he is "nothing more than a foundation". She further attacked his decision to accept the Nobel Peace Prize with F. W. de Klerk. Among other things, she reportedly claimed Mandela was no longer "accessible" to her daughters. She referred to Archbishop Desmond Tutu, in his capacity as the head of the Truth and Reconciliation Commission, as a "cretin".

The interview attracted media attention, and the ANC announced that it would ask her to explain her comments regarding Nelson Mandela. On 14 March 2010, a statement was issued on Madikizela-Mandela's behalf claiming that the interview was a fabrication.

== Death and funeral ==
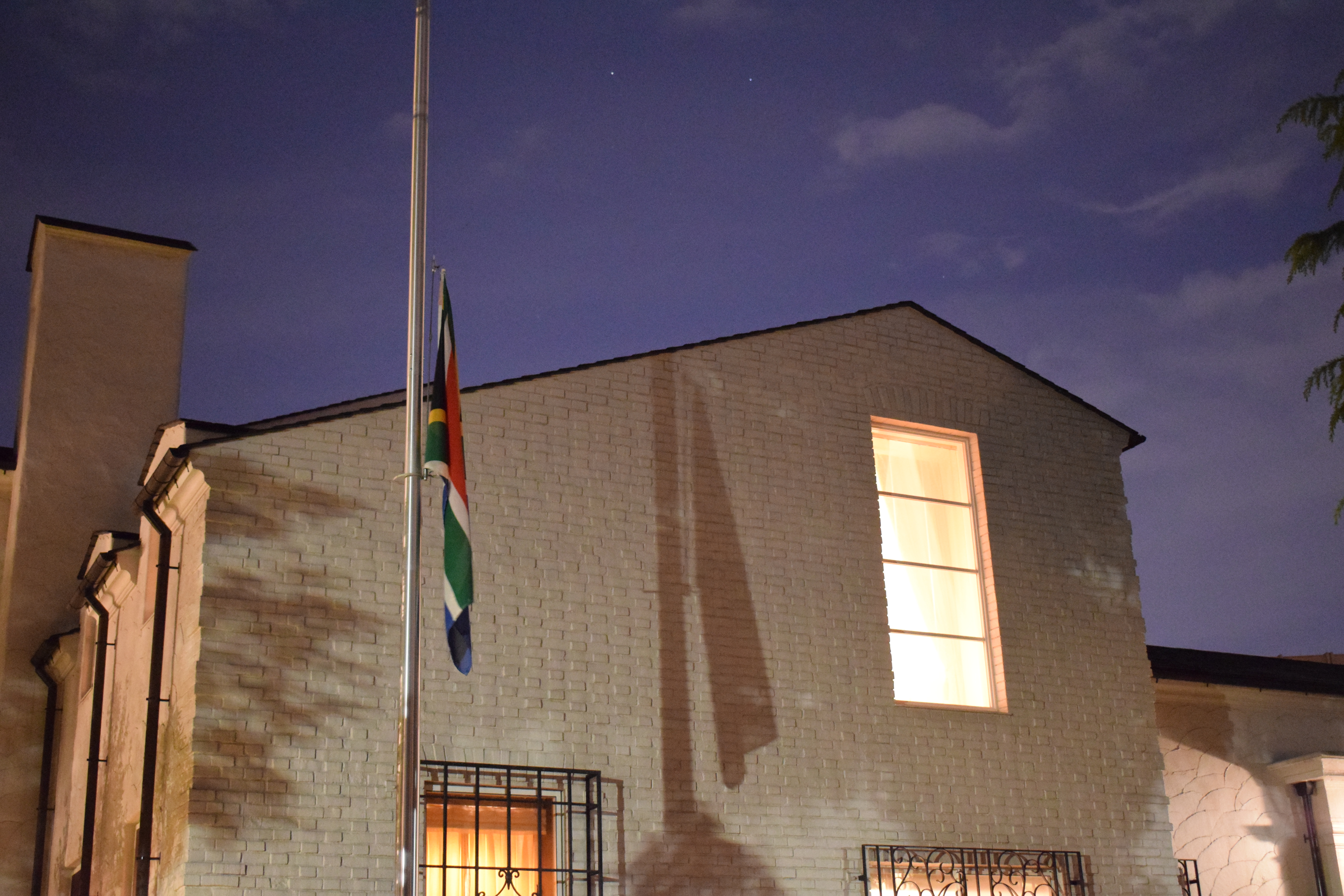
Flag at half-staff at the residence of the South African ambassador in Tokyo on 4 April 2018

Winnie Madikizela-Mandela died at the Netcare Milpark Hospital in Johannesburg on 2 April 2018 at the age of 81. She suffered from diabetes and had recently undergone several major surgeries. She "had been in and out of hospital since the start of the year".

In the lead-up to Madikizela-Mandela's funeral, in a politically fraught environment soon after the ouster of former president Jacob Zuma, Jessie Duarte, a senior ANC leader, warned critics to "sit down and shut up", with Economic Freedom Fighters leader Julius Malema saying that "anyone who accuses Mama Winnie of any crime is guilty of treason".

Madikizela-Mandela was granted a "Special Official Funeral" by the South African government. Her public funeral service was held at Orlando Stadium on 14 April 2018. Planning for Madikizela Mandela's funeral was largely handled by her daughters and Julius Malema, and the ANC reportedly had to "fight for space" on the programme. At the public service, ANC and South African President Cyril Ramaphosa "acknowledged" that the ANC failed to stand by Madikizela-Mandela's side during her legal troubles. Julius Malema delivered an impassioned speech in which he criticised the United Democratic Front for distancing themselves from Madikizela-Mandela in the 1980s. Malema also criticised members of the National Executive Committee of the ANC Women's League for resigning in 1995, because they regarded Madikizela-Mandela as a "criminal". Madikizela-Mandela's daughter Zenani attacked those who "vilified" her mother, calling them hypocrites. After the public service, her body was interred at a cemetery in Fourways in the north of Johannesburg during a private memorial service.

A number of ANC figures prepared to defend themselves against the allegations made at the funeral; however, the ANC urged "restraint".

== In popular culture ==
Mandela was portrayed by Alfre Woodard in the 1987 HBO TV movie, Mandela. Woodard earned both a CableACE Award and an NAACP Image Award for her performance, as did costar Danny Glover, who portrayed Nelson Mandela.

Tina Lifford played her in the 1997 TV film Mandela and de Klerk. Sophie Okonedo portrayed her in the BBC drama Mrs Mandela, first broadcast on BBC Four on 25 January 2010.

Jennifer Hudson played her in Winnie Mandela, directed by Darrell Roodt, released in Canada by D Films on 16 September 2011. Roodt, Andre Pieterse, and Paul L. Johnson based the film's script on Anne Marie du Preez Bezdrob's biography, Winnie Mandela: A Life. The Creative Workers Union of South Africa opposed the choice of Hudson in the title role, saying the use of foreign actors to tell the country's stories undermined efforts to develop the national film industry. Though the performances of Hudson and Terrance Howard, who portrayed Nelson Mandela, earned praise from many critics, the film was a critical and commercial failure.

In 2007, an opera based on her life called The Passion of Winnie was produced in Canada; however, she was declined a visa to attend its world premiere and associated gala fundraising concert.

Mandela was again portrayed in the 2013 film Mandela: Long Walk to Freedom by actress Naomie Harris (British actor Idris Elba played Nelson Mandela). On viewing the film, Madikizela-Mandela told Harris it was "the first time she felt her story had been captured on film". Gugulethu okaMseleku, writing in The Guardian, stated that the film had returned Madikizela-Mandela to her rightful place, recognising her role in "the struggle" that, "for South African women ... was more fundamental than her husband's."

== Honours and awards ==
In 1985, Mandela won the Robert F. Kennedy Human Rights Award along with fellow activists Allan Boesak and Beyers Naudé for their human rights work in South Africa. She received a Candace Award for Distinguished Service from the National Coalition of 100 Black Women in 1988.

In January 2018, the University Council and University Senate of Makerere University, Kampala, Uganda, approved the award of an honorary Doctor of Laws (LLD) degree to Winnie Nomzamo Madikizela-Mandela, in recognition of her fight against apartheid in South Africa.

In 2021, the Mbizana Local Municipality in the Eastern Cape (which includes her birthplace) was officially renamed the Winnie Madikizela-Mandela Local Municipality. The town of Brandfort in the Free State was also officially renamed as Winnie Mandela.

In 2022, the section of the R562 road connecting Midrand with Olifantsfontein, was renamed from Olifantsfontein Road to Winnie Madikizela-Mandela Road by the City of Ekurhuleni in Gauteng.

On 26 September 2023, William Nicol Drive (forming the M81 road and part of the R511 road) in the City of Johannesburg (from Sandton to Diepsloot) in Gauteng was renamed to Winnie Mandela Drive.

== See also ==
- List of civil rights leaders
- List of people subject to banning orders under apartheid
- The Resurrection of Winnie Mandela, 2018 biography of Mandela by Sisonke Msimang
- List of members of the National Assembly of South Africa who died in office

Academic offices
Preceded by Michael Kelly	Rector of the University of Glasgow; 1987–1990	Succeeded by Pat Kane
