= Stompie Seipei =

South African teenage political murder victim (1974–1989)

- Born: James Seipei; 1974; Parys, South Africa
- Died: 1 January 1989 (aged 14); Soweto, Johannesburg Metropolitan Municipality, Gauteng, South Africa
- Cause of death: Murdered (by Jerry Vusi Richardson)
- Other name: Stompie Moeketsi

James Seipei (1974 – 1 January 1989), also known as Stompie Moeketsi or Stompie Sepei, was a teenage United Democratic Front (UDF) activist from Parys, South Africa. He and three other boys were kidnapped on 29 December 1988 by members of Winnie Mandela's bodyguards (known as the Mandela United Football Club). He was murdered on 1 January 1989, the only one of the boys to be killed.

== Activism ==
Seipei joined the street uprising against apartheid in April 1985 at age ten, and soon took on a leading role. He became the country's youngest political detainee when he spent his 12th birthday in jail without trial. At the age of 13 he was expelled from school.

== Murder ==
Seipei, together with Kenny Kgase, Pelo Mekgwe and Thabiso Mono, were kidnapped on 29 December 1988 from the Methodist manse in Orlando, Soweto, the home of a Methodist minister, Paul Verryn. Seipei was wrongly accused of being a police informer. Screams were heard as the 14-year-old was murdered by Jerry Vusi Richardson, a member of Winnie Mandela's team of bodyguards. Richardson died in 2009. Seipei's body was recovered on waste ground near Winnie Mandela's home on 6 January 1989. His throat had been cut. Richardson was later convicted of the murder. He stated that Winnie Mandela had ordered him, with others, to abduct the four youths from Soweto, of whom Seipei was the youngest. The four were severely beaten.

== Involvement of Winnie Mandela ==
In 1991, Winnie Mandela was convicted of kidnapping and being an accessory to assault, but her six-year jail sentence was reduced to a fine and a two-year suspended sentence on appeal. Mandela's role was later probed as part of the Truth and Reconciliation Commission (TRC) hearings, in 1997.

Appearing before the TRC in 1997, she said allegations that she was involved in at least 18 human rights abuses including eight murders were "ridiculous" and said that her main accuser, former comrade Katiza Cebekhulu, was a former "mental patient" and his allegations against her were "hallucinations". Cebekhulu had himself, before the 1991 trial, been tortured and kidnapped to Zambia, where he was detained for almost three years, at the behest of the ANC, before moving to the United Kingdom. The Commission found that the abduction of Seipei had been carried out on Mandela's instructions, and that she had "initiated and participated in the assaults", had resisted efforts by the "Mandela Crisis Committee" to get the boys released, and had attempted to cover up the death by claiming that Seipei had fled to Botswana. With regard to the actual murder of Seipei, the Commission found Mandela "negligent in that she failed to act responsibly in taking the necessary action required to avert his death".

In February 1989, Abu Asvat, a prominent Soweto doctor, who had examined Seipei after his abduction, was shot dead at his medical practice. Winnie Mandela's alleged role in Asvat's killing was later probed as part of the TRC hearings after Asvat's murder; in addition her associate, Katiza Cebekhulu, implicated her in the murder of Asvat, as part of a cover-up of Seipei's death. The hearings were later adjourned amid claims that witnesses were being intimidated on Winnie Mandela's orders.

In a 2017 documentary, former Soweto police officer Henk Heslinga alleged that former safety minister Sydney Mufamadi had instructed him to re-open the investigation into the death of Seipei, for the purpose of charging Winnie Mandela with murder. In the documentary, Heslinga claimed that Richardson admitted during an interview that Seipei had discovered Richardson was an informant and that he killed the child to cover his tracks. However, Mufamadi denied the allegations in the documentary, stating that Helsinga's statements were false. The documentary had been described in a review by Vanity Fair as "unabashedly one-sided" and "overwhelmingly defensive". Commentator Max du Preez called the decision by television station eNCA to broadcast the documentary without context in the week prior to Madikizela-Mandela's funeral a "serious mistake", and he described the film as making "outrageous claims", while former TRC commissioner Dumisa Ntsebeza questioned the motives of the documentary maker. In 2024 Katiza Cebekhulu wrote a book in London, where he is still stranded, titled:"Winnie Mandela, Stompie Moeketsi & Me; My story of a notorious murder and the events that followed".

== See also ==
- List of kidnappings (1980–1989)
- Lists of solved missing person cases
