= Mandela (disambiguation) =

Nelson Mandela (1918−2013) was an anti-apartheid activist and president of South Africa.

Mandela may also refer to:

== Film ==
- Mandela (1987 film), an HBO television film
- Mandela (1996 film), a documentary film
- Mandela (2021 film), 2021 Indian comedy drama film by Madonne Ashwin
- Mandela: Long Walk to Freedom, a 2013 biographical film about Nelson Mandela

== Moths ==
- Mandela (moth), a synonym of the moth genus Cryptochrostis in the family Erebidae
- Elasmia mandela, a species of moth of the family Notodontidae

== Places ==
- Mandela, Rajasthan, a village in Sikar, Rajasthan, India
- Mandela, Lazio, a town in Italy
- Mandela, Massachusetts, a proposed town in Massachusetts

== People with the surname ==
- Cedza Mandela-Dlamini (b. 1976), Swazi prince and humanitarian, step-grandson of Nelson Mandela
- Makaziwe Mandela (b. 1954), South African businesswoman, daughter of Nelson Mandela
- Makgatho Mandela (1950–2005), South African lawyer, son of Nelson Mandela
- Mandela family, South African political dynasty
- Mandla Mandela (b. 1974), South African chief and politician, grandson of Nelson Mandela
- Ndaba Mandela (b. 1982), South African humanitarian, grandson of Nelson Mandela
- Ndileka Mandela (b. 1965), South African activist, granddaughter of Nelson Mandela
- Ocansey Mandela (b. 1990), Burkina Faso football player
- Thembekile Mandela (1945–1969), son of Nelson Mandela
- Winnie Madikizela-Mandela (1936–2018), anti-apartheid activist, politician, and ex-wife of Nelson Mandela
- Zenani Mandela-Dlamini (born 1959), South African diplomat, daughter of Nelson Mandela
- Zindzi Mandela-Hlongwane (1960–2020), South African diplomat, daughter of Nelson Mandela
- Zinhle Mandela-Dlamini (b. 1980), Swazi prince, medical practitioner and businessman, grandson of Nelson Mandela
- Zoleka Mandela (1980–2023), South African writer and activist, granddaughter of Nelson Mandela

Fictional characters

- William Mandella, fictional soldier character introduced in the American novel series The Forever War, specifically in the book A Separate War

== People with the given name ==
- Mandela Barnes (born 1986), American politician
- Mandela Egbo (born 1997), English footballer
- Mandela Kapere (died 2020), Namibian politician
- Mandela Keita (born 2002), Belgian footballer
- Mandela Van Peebles (born 1994), American actor

== Other uses ==
- Mandela effect, a false memory shared by a large group of people
- Mandela National Stadium, Uganda
- Mandela: The Authorised Biography, a 1999 book by Anthony Sampson
- Mandela Trophy, a cricket tournament
- The Mandela Catalogue, analog horror web series

== See also ==
- Mandala (disambiguation)
- Mandeliidae, a sea slug family
