= Mandela family =

Dynasty of South African politicians and traditional aristocrats

Mandela
- Parent house: AmaHala
- Current region: South Africa eSwatini
- Origin: Thembuland
- Founded: 18th century
- Founder: Inkosana Mandela KaNgubengcuka
- Current head: Mandla Mandela
- Titles: List: Inkosi of Mvezo; Inkosikazi of Mvezo; Inkosana of Mvezo; Inkosazana of Mvezo; InDuna of Thembuland
- Connected families: Swazi royal family Machel family
- Estate: Mvezo Great Place

The Mandela family is a South African political family and royal dynasty. Its most prominent member was Nelson Mandela, who served as President of South Africa from 1994 to 1999.

== History ==
The Mandelas are direct descendants of the AmaHala clan, the ruling dynasty of the Kingdom of AbaThembu; as a result, their leader has traditionally had a hereditary claim to both membership of the Thembu king's privy council and the chieftaincy of the town of Mvezo that is subject to his authority.

The family was started in the 18th century, when King Ngubengcuka of the Thembus married and left a son named Mandela, the first of the direct line to bear the name. Prince Mandela was a son of a woman that belonged to the Ixhiba House, a ritually inferior lineage when compared to his father's AmaHalas, and therefore his cadet branch of the dynasty was deemed to be morganatic. Due to this, in lieu of having a place in the line of succession, he and his heirs were recognized as privy councillors thereafter.

The prince's own son, Gadla Henry Mphakanyiswa Mandela, was later also given the title of the chief of Mvezo by his relative, the king of Thembuland, as a further marker of the family's eminence. After being lost in the Apartheid era, this chieftaincy has since been restored to the Mandelas.

During the title's abeyance, the claim to it passed to Chief Mandela's son Nelson, who would never inherit it. Following his renunciation of it in order to become active in the anti-Apartheid movement, it would later pass to his sons Thembekile and Makgatho, and following their own early deaths, to Makgatho's son Mandla. Chief Mandla Mandela would ultimately succeed to the title in 2007 following its restoration.

== Prominent members ==
- President Nelson Mandela, anti-Apartheid activist, humanitarian and head of state
- Dr. Graça Machel D.B.E., politician and humanitarian, widow of Nelson Mandela
- Dr. Winnie Madikizela-Mandela M.P., anti-Apartheid activist and politician, ex-wife of Nelson Mandela
- Princess Zenani Mandela-Dlamini of eSwatini, diplomat and Swazi princess, daughter of Nelson Mandela
- Ambassador Zindzi Mandela-Hlongwane, diplomat, daughter of Nelson Mandela
- Chief Mandla Mandela M.P., politician and traditional aristocrat, grandson of Nelson Mandela (through Makgatho)

== Other members ==
- Prince Cedza Dlamini, Swazi prince and humanitarian, step-grandson of Nelson Mandela (through Zenani)
- Evelyn Mase, nurse, ex-wife of Nelson Mandela
- Josina Z. Machel, activist and humanitarian, step-daughter of Nelson Mandela (through Graça)
- Makaziwe Mandela, businesswoman, daughter of Nelson Mandela
- Makgatho Mandela, lawyer, son of Nelson Mandela
- Ndaba Mandela, humanitarian, grandson of Nelson Mandela (through Makgatho)
- Ndileka Mandela, activist, granddaughter of Nelson Mandela (through Thembekile)
- Thembekile Mandela, son of Nelson Mandela.
- Prince Zinhle Dlamini, Swazi prince, medical doctor and businessman, grandson of Nelson Mandela (through Zenani)
- Zoleka Mandela, writer and activist, granddaughter of Nelson Mandela (through Zindzi)
