= Tukwini Mandela =

South African advertising executive (born 1974)

- Born: Tukwini Makaziwe Mandela; 29 December 1974 (age 51); Johannesburg, South Africa
- Education: Amherst High School; Wits University; AAA School of Advertising
- Organization: House of Mandela Foundation
- Parent(s): Camagu Balfour; Makaziwe Mandela
- Relatives: Thembekile Mandela (uncle); Makgatho Mandela (uncle); Zenani Mandela-Dlamini (aunt); Zindzi Mandela-Hlongwane (aunt)

Tukwini Mandela (born 29 December 1974) is a South African advertising executive and a co-founder of the House of Mandela Foundation.

She is the granddaughter of Nelson Mandela and his first wife Evelyn Mase.

== Early life and education ==
Tukwini Mandela was born in the Eastern Cape in December 1974. She is the oldest child of Makaziwe Mandela and has three siblings Dumani, Kweku, and Adjoa. While her mother was away studying at university, Tukwini, along with her siblings and many cousins, was raised by her grandmother Evelyn until the age of 10. In 1985, shortly before her 11th birthday, she moved with her mother, father, and siblings to the US as her parents had received scholarships to further their studies. Living in the US was challenging for Tukwini and her brother Dumani, as they spoke no English.

After matriculating from Amherst High School, Tukwini joined her mother in Kenya and lived there for six months. She finally returned home to South Africa in 1994, obtaining her degree in Social Work at Wits University and a certificate in Account Management from the AAA School of Advertising.

== Career ==
Tukwini Mandela went on to work for two advertising agencies, Leo Burnett and Foote Cone and Belding, where she managed accounts such as Coca-Cola, Procter & Gamble, Sasol, and Kellogg's, later joining the First National Bank as a Communications Consultant in the Advertising Unit, where she advised internal clients on marketing and communication strategies, project management, management of budgets, development of advertising campaigns, and the development of the Advertising Department's operating processes. Together with her mother Makaziwe Mandela, she established the House of Mandela Foundation in 2010.
