= Waterford Kamhlaba =

Coordinates: 26°18′10.57″S 31°06′14.60″E

Waterford Kamhlaba United World College of Southern Africa
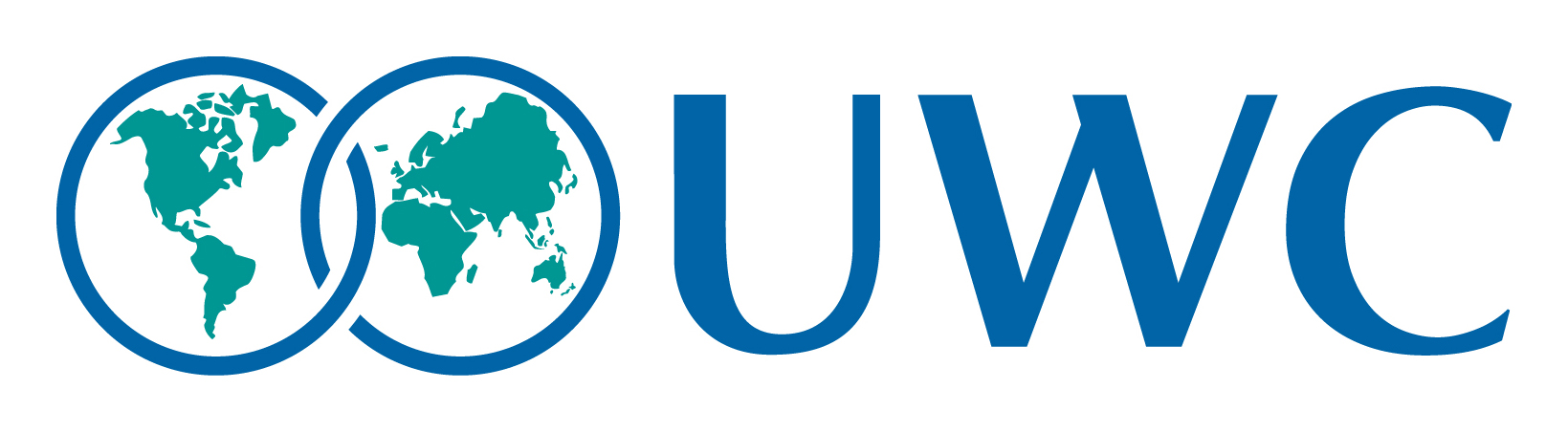

- Mbabane, Eswatini; Eswatini

Information
- Type: International Baccalaureate school, IGCSE, private
- Motto: UWC makes education a force to unite people, nations and cultures for peace and a sustainable future.
- Established: Founded 1963; Joined UWC 1981
- Enrollment: 750
- Affiliation: United World Colleges
- Website: waterford.sz

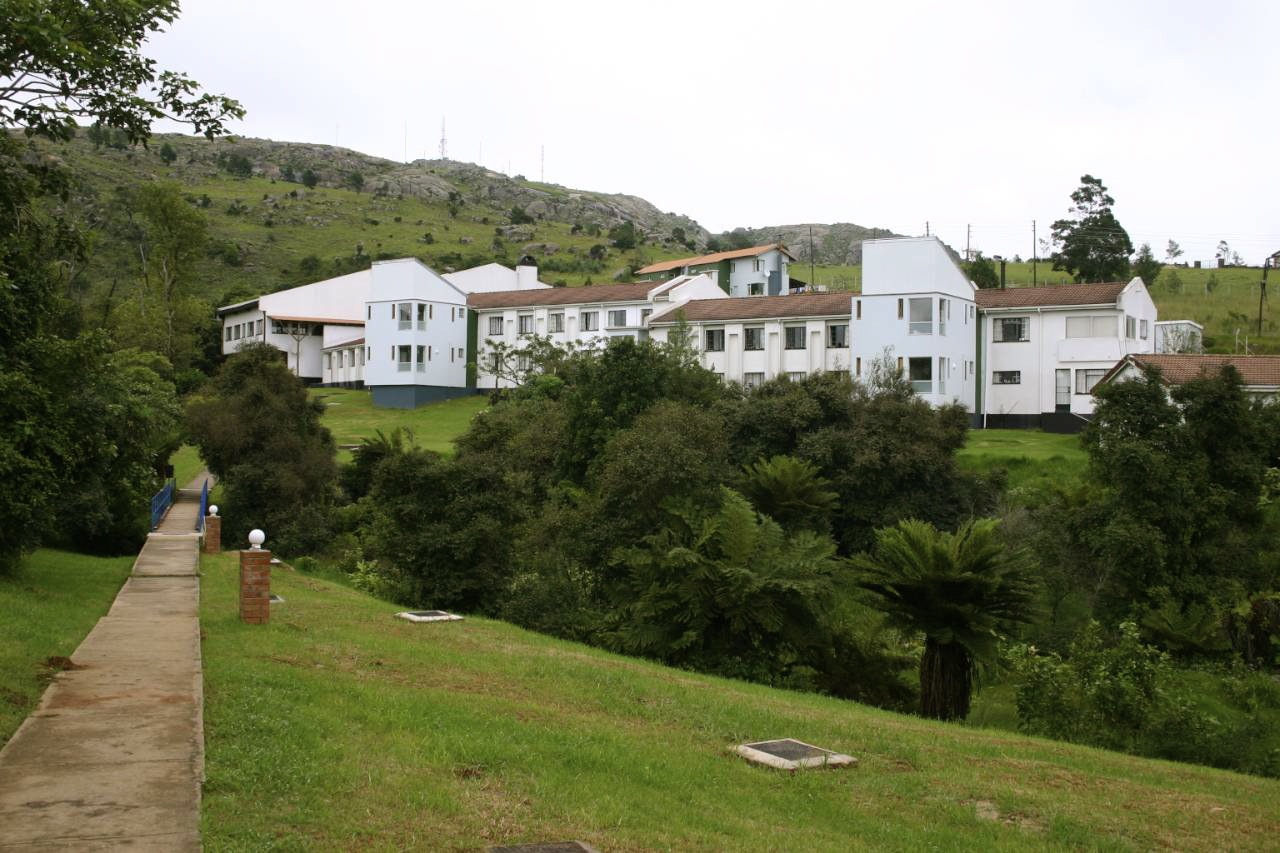
Waterford Kamhlaba's Emhlabeni (IB) Hostel

Waterford Kamhlaba United World College of Southern Africa (WKUWCSA) is a private educational institution for secondary grades near Mbabane, Eswatini. It is one of 18 international schools and colleges in the United World Colleges educational movement. It offers an International Baccalaureate and IGCSE.

Waterford was the first school in southern Africa open to children and youth of all races and ethnicities. The school was established by Michael Stern in 1963, in direct opposition to the apartheid regime in neighboring South Africa. The school's mission was similar to the philosophy of the UWC movement, and Waterford became the fourth member school of the UWC movement in 1981. The campus was designed by Portuguese architect Pancho Guedes, who agreed to work with the school's founding team pro-bono. He would later enroll his own children at the school.

The children of Nelson Mandela, Desmond Tutu, and many others leaders in the struggle against apartheid were educated at the school. Nelson Mandela was honorary president of the United World Colleges for several years.

== Notable alumni ==
- Ruha Benjamin, professor of African American studies at Princeton University
- Ian Khama, former President of Botswana
- Robin Chase, American entrepreneur
- Daliso Chaponda, comedian
- Kemiyondo Coutinho, Ugandan playwright, actress and filmmaker
- Jonathan Crush, scientist
- Keith Fraser, 1992 Olympic athlete
- Paul Friedlander, Swazi golfer
- Richard E. Grant, actor
- Kate Lamb, Welsh actress
- Solomon Guramatunhu, ophthalmologist
- Fernando Honwana, special advisor to Samora Machel killed with Machel in 1986 plane crash
- Stian Jenssen, Director of the Private Office of NATOs Secretary General, Jens Stoltenberg
- Aaron Kopp, documentary maker
- Anna Livia, author
- John MacMillan, actor
- Alan McGregor (academic) former Dean of Medicine, King's College, UK
- Makaziwe Mandela, daughter of Nelson Mandela
- Mandla Mandela, South African tribal chief
- Zenani Mandela, daughter of Nelson Mandela
- Zindzi Mandela, daughter of Nelson Mandela
- Maria Alejandra Molina, Actress and news anchor
- Nnenna Okore, Nigerian-Australian artist
- Ignacio Padilla, Mexican author
- Matthew Parris, politician/writer/journalist, London, UK
- Lindiwe Sisulu, former Minister of Defence and Minister of Housing, South Africa
- Xochitl Torres Small, U.S. representative from New Mexico's 2nd congressional district
- Thomas Ward, mathematician
- Alan Whiteside, academic and researcher

== See also ==
- Dick and Enid Eyeington
- Michael Stern
