= Mandela Effect (disambiguation) =

The Mandela effect is a phenomenon of false collective memory.

Mandela Effect or The Mandela Effect may also refer to:

- Mandela Effect (album), 2017, by Gonjasufi
- The Mandela Effect (film), a 2019 American film
- Mandela Effect, a 2022 album by Hiljson Mandela
- Bad Ben: The Mandela Effect, a 2018 American film and the fourth installment in the Bad Ben film series

== See also ==
- Mandela (disambiguation)
