= Zoleka Mandela =

South African writer and activist (1980–2023)

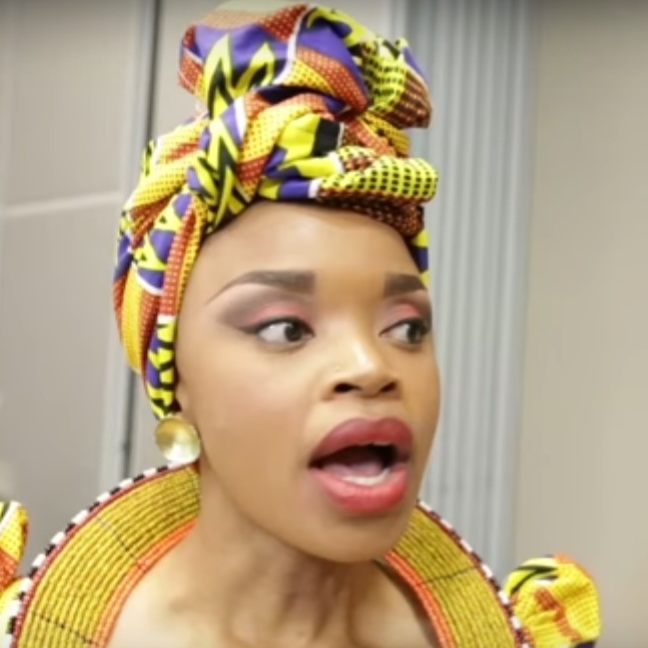
- Mandela in 2015
- Born: 9 April 1980; Johannesburg, South Africa
- Died: 25 September 2023 (aged 43); Johannesburg, South Africa
- Children: 6
- Mother: Zindzi Mandela
- Relatives: Nelson Mandela (grandfather); Winnie Madikizela-Mandela (grandmother); Zenani Mandela-Dlamini (aunt)

Zoleka Zobuhle Mandela (9 April 1980 – 25 September 2023) was a South African writer and activist, and Nelson Mandela's granddaughter. She wrote about her addictions to sex, alcohol and drugs, her daughter's death, and her own battles with breast cancer, which killed her in 2023. She is the author of When Hope Whispers which she published in 2013.

== Life and activism ==
Zoleka Mandela was born on 9 April 1980 to Zindziswa Mandela and Oupa Johannes Seakamela, a Northern Sotho man from Limpopo. She was conceived at her mother's childhood home which is now a museum in Soweto. Her grandmother, Winnie Mandela was exiled to Brandfort at the time. She had three younger maternal half-brothers, Zondwa, Bambatha and Zwelabo. Her mother's family, the Mandelas, are direct descendants of King Madiba of the Thembu people and serve as chieftains of Mvezo, their ancestral chiefdom.

She spoke about sexual abuse in her childhood allegedly from Mike Seakamela, Mandla Mandela and AbaThembu king Buyelekhaya Dalinyebo. She was also addicted to drugs and alcohol for a time in her youth.

On 11 June 2010, Mandela's 13-year-old daughter, Zenani Zanethemba Nomasonto Mandela (b. 9 June 1997) was killed in a car crash on the way home from a 2010 FIFA World Cup concert in Johannesburg. The accident occurred when the chauffeur of the vehicle carrying Zenani was hit by a drunk driver, she was the only fatality. Zoleka at the time was recovering from a suicide attempt in hospital. She was described as being "devastated" by the incident. She lost her infant son, Zenawe Zibuyile Mandela in 2011 who was born prematurely. Mandela published her autobiography "When Hope Whispers" in 2013.

Zoleka has a son Zwelami Mandela (b.2003) and was married once to Thierry Bashala, with whom she had two daughters, Zanyiwe (b.2014) and Zenzile (b.2019). The couple later divorced. Her youngest daughter, Zingce (b. April 2022) is fathered by her former boyfriend Andile Leeroy Cana.

Mandela has campaigned via her foundation against deaths caused by road accidents noting the particular hazards affecting sub-Saharan African children who are twice as likely to be killed in car accidents as children anywhere else in the world.

== Illness and death ==
Mandela was treated for breast cancer in 2011, which returned in 2016. She used social media to describe the removed tumour and side effects of her chemotherapy treatment. In August 2022, Mandela disclosed on social media that she had been diagnosed with cancer in her lungs, liver, ribs, brain, spinal cord and hips. She was hospitalized in early September 2023 for ongoing treatment for metastatic cancer and family members stated that recent scans have revealed significant disease progression including fibrosis in the lungs and several emboli.

In the months leading to her death, Mandela drafted her will and planned her memorial and funeral service which included a list of prominent family members excluded from attending, her cousin Ndileka Mandela confirmed its authenticity. Mandela died from terminal cancer on 25 September 2023, at the age of 43. She was not buried at Fourways Memorial Park in Johannesburg alongside her mother, grandmother and children as she had requested because during the burial, her aunt Zenani Mandela-Dlamini arrived with the South African Police Service to enforce a court interdict to have her late niece buried elsewhere at a gravesite allegedly purchased by her ex-husband, Thierry Bashala which he has denied. The event has divided the family.

== Honours ==
In 2016, she was chosen as one of the BBC's "100 Women". She noted that her big regret was that she felt that she had only done worthwhile things after her grandfather's death, not while he was alive.

== Bibliography ==
- Mandela, Zoleka (14 April 2014). When Hope Whispers. Johannesburg: Jacana Media. ISBN 9781431409044.
