= Solomon Guramatunhu =

- Education: University of Zimbabwe
- Known for: Providing free Cataract surgery.
- Scientific career
- Fields: Medicine, Ophthalmologist
- Workplaces: University of Zimbabwe College of Health Sciences

Solomon Guramatunhu is a Zimbabwean medical doctor that specializes in the surgical and medical care of the eyes. He attended Waterford Kamhlaba United World College of Southern Africa, obtained his undergraduate medical degrees from the University of Zimbabwe and postgraduate qualifications in ophthalmology from the Royal College of Surgeons of England and the Royal College of Surgeons of Edinburgh.
