= Nnenna Okore =

Nigerian-American artist (born 1975)

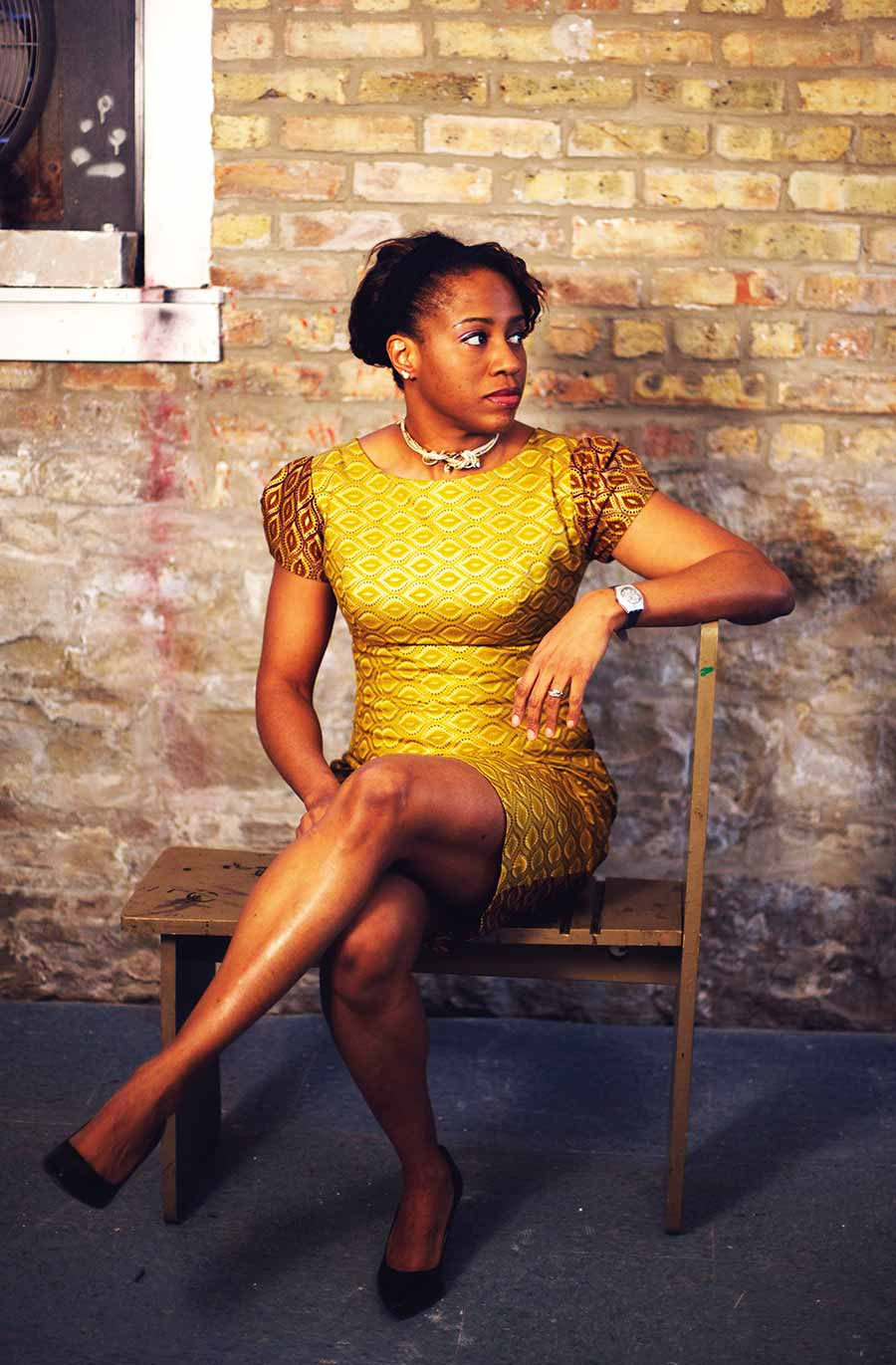
- Okore, 2014
- Born: 1975 (age 50–51); Canberra, Australia
- Education: University of Nigeria; University of Iowa; Monash University
- Known for: Sculpture; installation art; environmental art
- Awards: UNIFEM Women's Empowerment Art Prize (1994); Artist-in-residence/Teaching Fellowship, Skidmore College (2011); Fulbright Scholarship (2012); Threewalls Research and Development Lab (RaDLab) Award (2018); Creative Victoria Creators Fund (2021)
- Website: nnennaokore.com

Nnenna Okore (born 1975 in Canberra, Australia) is an Australian-born Nigerian artist who lives and works in Chicago at North Park University, Chicago. Her largely abstract sculptural forms are inspired by richly textured forms and colours within the natural environment. Okore's work frequently uses flotsam or discarded objects to create intricate sculptures and installations through repetitive and labor-intensive processes. She learnt some of her intricate methods, including weaving, sewing, rolling, twisting and dyeing, by watching local Nigerians perform daily domestic tasks. In her more recent works, Okore uses plant-based materials (in particular, food scraps and food waste) to create large bioplastic art forms and installations. Her work has been shown in galleries and museums within and outside of the United States. She has won several international awards, including a Fulbright Scholar Award in 2012. and the Australian Creative Victoria Award in 2021.

Okore is currently a Professor of Art at North Park University in Chicago, where she runs the sculpture program. As an environmental artist, researcher, and teacher, Okore uses her eco-centered art practice to engender learning, artistic experience, and ecological awareness through art.

== Background ==
Okore was born in Canberra, Australia to parents from Uturu, Abia State in the southeastern region of Nigeria. After moving from Australia to Nigeria at the age of four, Okore spent most of her childhood in the university town of Nsukka, Enugu State in southeastern Nigeria, where both parents worked as academics at the University of Nigeria, Nsukka (UNN). Okore was raised a Christian and though not exposed to traditional Igbo practices early in life, she later reconnected with the cultural elements from her Igbo heritage. Okore's art was subsequently influenced by visual characteristics of the Nsukka environs, such as dilapidated mud adobe houses with zinc roofing, piles of firewood accumulated against a broken structure, traditional clothing, concrete blocks, market wares, and rugged terrains. Growing up in a tropical environment where decay and rebirth were integral to the way of life, she also had a strong fascination for lifeless materials in nature, including rocks, tree bark, detritus, and skeletal forms. She was especially enamored by the red-coloured Nsukka soil that characteristically left traces of red dust on most things.

Living on the university campus, Okore was closely connected to the rural Nsukka neighborhoods that bordered the school vicinity. She drew lots of creative inspirations and material sensibilities from their cultural and social landscapes. These cultural experiences have contributed to how she addresses subjects spanning environmental issues to the embodied connectivity to material things, people and natural forces in her works.

== Education ==
Okore attended the University of Nigeria Nsukka Primary School, the University of Nigeria Nsukka Secondary School, and the Waterford Kamhlaba United World College in Swaziland for high school. Her enthusiasm for art grew during her primary school years, when she started knitting, sewing, and crocheting. In her secondary school years, she drew and painted many still-life compositions. During that time, Okore won multiple art awards, including the UNESCO African Child Art Prize in 1993. She credits her artistic growth to her family, whom she notes were incredibly supportive, and enabling of her desire to pursue art.

By the time she graduated from high school in Swaziland, Okore was proficient in printmaking, pottery, modeling, and acrylic painting. A few years later, she won the UNIFEM Women's Empowerment Art Prize (1994) which earned her several roundtrips to local and international destinations in Nigeria, Senegal, and China to represent African youth at women's conferences. She was also selected as Nigerian female youth ambassador for the Fourth World Conferences on Women in Beijing, China (1995), which platformed many international female celebrities and leaders from across the globe.

In 1995, Okore enrolled in the Fine and Applied Arts undergraduate program at the University of Nigeria, Nsukka. Her first mediums were oil and acrylic paint. Though she was drawn to colour in her work, she sought to distinguish herself from other students by using unorthodox materials found in natural surroundings. By her third year, Okore began experimenting with some unusual materials on canvas, such as leaves, jute fiber, cloth, sticks, shredded photographs, broomsticks, recycled paper, and leather, among others. This enabled her to create unique surface textures that were characterized by buildups with soil, rope, fabric and other found objects. By her final year as an undergraduate student, her focus had widened to include a discourse on the transformative power of material things. Few teachers from the Nsukka school that influenced Okore during her time there, included Chijioke Onuora, Chike Aniakor, and El Anatsui. Okore was also heavily influenced by Arte Povera whose experiential style appeals strongly to her visual narrative. Okore received a bachelor's degree in fine and applied arts from the University of Nigeria, Nsukka in 1999, with first-class honors. Two years later, Okore relocated to the United States for a masters of fine arts program at the University of Iowa, which she completed in 2005. Okore also has an interdisciplinary Fine Arts PhD degree, which she received in 2023 from Monash University.

== Professional accomplishments ==
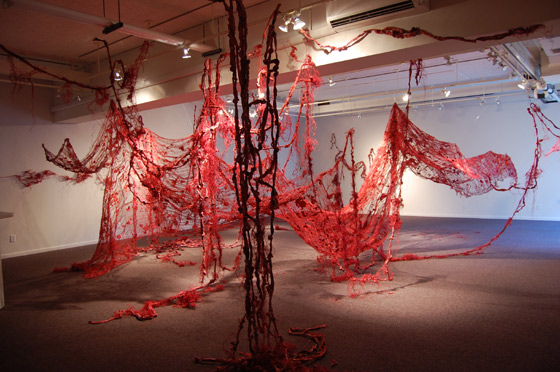
Fiber art installation

After graduating from the University of Iowa, Okore was recruited by North Park University in 2005 to teach and oversee its sculptural program. She is presently a Professor of Art and instructs students in Three-dimensional Designs, Sculptural Practices, Video Art, and Drawing, among other subjects. Okore also maintains a robust studio practice while also being a mother of three. To balance her career and personal life, she devotes, at least, two days of the week to her studio practice. According to her, "It all boils down to being extremely disciplined and ensuring that one attends equally to both the personal and professional life".

Okore has participated in over 120 solo and group shows combined, across local and international venues in Asia, Europe, North America, Africa, and the far east. She has been featured in publications, such as Sculpture Magazine, The New York Times, Financial Times, Art South Africa, Ceramics: Art and Perception, and The Guardian, among others. In 2012, Okore received a Fulbright Scholar Award, which enabled her to travel to Nigeria for a year-long teaching project at the University of Lagos. During her one-year stint, she produced a new body of eco-based artworks and introduced students to environmental art concepts that focused on nature-centered processes, materials, and sites. She returned to the United States after completing her project in 2013.

Okore is also a recipient of the 2021 Australian Creative Victoria Creators Fund Award. Her works have been featured in important exhibitions at the Museum of Art and Design, The Frances Young Tang Teaching Museum and Art Gallery, Museum of Contemporary African Diasporic Art, Spelman College Museum of Fine Art, Museu Afro Brasil, Memphis Brooks Museum of Art, Samuel Dorsky Museum of Art, Musée des Civilizations Noires, and Cleveland Museum of Art. Okore's towering installation titled, 'And the World Keeps Turning' was on view at the 2021 Brugge Triënnale, Belgium. She has also featured in the Stoa 169 Columned Hall exhibition in Polling, Germany, the 'Invincible Hands' at the Yemi Shyllon Museum of Art, Lagos, and 2021 Chengdu Biennale in Chengdu, China.

== Materials ==
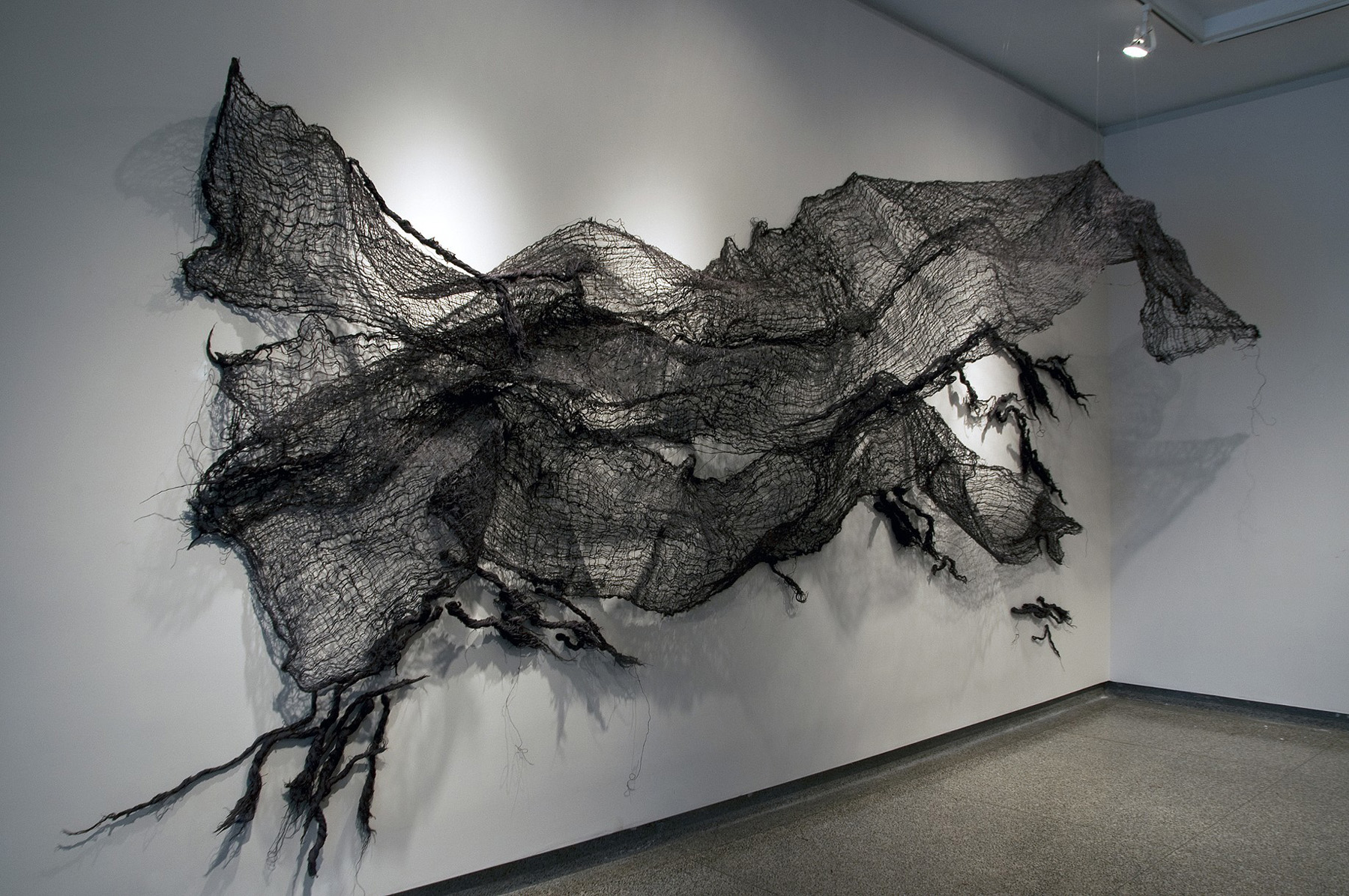
Fiber art installation

Okore's early years in the United States presented her with environmental and cultural differences. While adopting new materials inspired by her surroundings, she incorporated similar objects to those she used in Nigeria, like sticks, leaves, or jute materials. Okore's material choice is also heavily influenced by the philosophy of creating innovative artistic forms by repurposing everyday material. This style of making was adopted, in part out of necessity, due to the high cost of Western-produced art materials. Rather than being stifled by the ephemerality of materials like discarded newspapers or wax, Okore turned her focus to their sculptural potentialities instead.

Okore tends to feature organic, fibrous, malleable, and ethereal qualities of materials in her works. Her works, for instance, capture the visual characteristics of transient, root-like, or dense forms. Paper, in particular, offers a range of possibilities to Okore's process. By following the non-traditional route, she creates rich, bodily handmade paper textures by pulping and layering together materials including found paper, jute fiber, dye, coffee, and lint. She also incorporates the symbolic narrative that newspapers embody. Burlap which Okore uses for its transient and delicate features, is also featured in her fiber art works.

== Work and concept ==
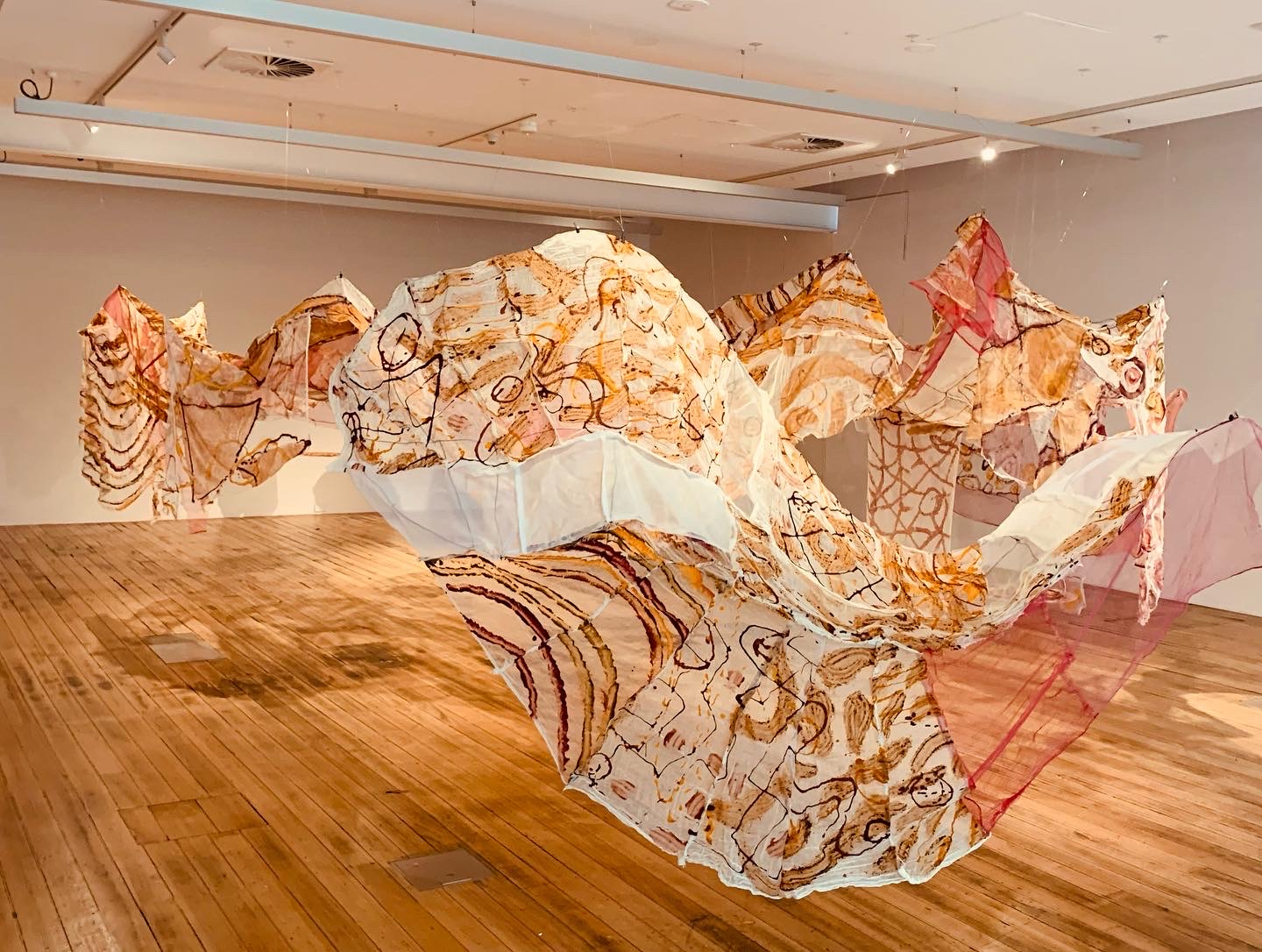
bioplastic Installation

Themes of aging, death, and decay are recurrent in Okore's work and highlight the vulnerability and fragility of Earth. Okore uses a "flora" (flower) motif or symbols repeatedly throughout her work to capture themes of death and fragility, as well as the essence of rebirth. She captures the diverse and tactile aspects of the physical world through weathered, dilapidated and lifeless forms. Through manually repetitive processes, Okore's works reveal the complex and distinct properties of fabric, trees, topography, and architecture. Her works are also inspired by traditional women's crafts in Africa such as textiles. Okore engages in a slow, arduous process of weaving, dyeing, winding, and teasing materials like burlap, wire, and paper, sometimes sourced from West Africa, to create dramatic textile installations. As a child, Okore saw local workers make crafts out of materials they transformed, which inspired her to have similar practices in her work. She upcycles and transforms materials in a way that changes the way people view them, encouraging her audience to value discarded things as beautiful.

More recently, Okore's environmental practice has expanded to include the creation of bioplastic artworks made from food waste, such as mushrooms, onion, orange, and banana peels. In her research with bioplastics, she positions the bioplastic material not only as an object for aestheticizing waste issues in the world, but as a concept for engaging in eco-art learning, teaching, and artmaking. Additionally, her works draw attention to different creative and ideological practices, such as new materialist and African animist theories, and a call-and-response methodology that provoke generative thinking about materialist practices with waste. Okore seeks to catalyze interconnections between human and nonhuman subjects in ways that go beyond simply extending her material practice with waste to calling attention to sustainable living.

Being an Igbo woman, Okore also draws on elements of Igbo culture and history, specifically the lasting effects of colonialism. Okore regularly takes trips home to Nigeria, as a way of staying connected to her Nigerian memories of the environment and culture that inspires much of her work.

== Gallery representation ==
- October Gallery, London, United States.
- Jenkins Johnson Gallery, San Francisco, United States.
- David Krut Gallery, New York City, United States.
- Kuaba Gallery, Indianapolis, United States.

== Select collections ==
- Krannert Art Museum, University of Urbana Champaign, USA.
- Jorge M. Pérez Collection, Miami, USA.
- EbonyLife Place, Victoria Island, Nigeria.
- Four Seasons Hotels and Resorts, California, USA.
- North Park University, Chicago, USA.
- World Bank, Washington DC, USA.
- Brooklyn Academy of Music, NY, USA.
- United States Embassy, Abuja, Nigeria.
- Eko Hotel and Suites, Lagos, Nigeria.
- Halls Winery, Napa, CA, USA.
- The Newark Museum of Art, New Jersey, USA.
- Jean Paul Blachère Fondation, France.
- Royal Collections, Abu Dhabi, UEA.
- Art House Contemporary Limited, Nigeria.
- Channel 4, London, UK.
- Renaissance Capital, Moscow, Russia.
- Daraja Art Foundation, London, UK.

== Sources ==
- Artist Profile from Nnenna Okore's website
- Robert Preece, "Political By Nature": 2500-word interview with Nnenna Okore, Sculpture Magazine, July/August 2013.
- Faustina Anyanwu, "Finding inspiration in the most simple things...", C.Hub Magazine, Issue 2, Vol. 1, 2012/13.
- Chris Spring, African Textiles Today, Smithsonian Book/British Museum Press, 2012.
- Nnenna Okore: 'Transfiguration', by Holland Cutter, New York Times, 9 November 2012.
- Jackie Wullschlarger, "We Face Forward...", Financial Times, 12 August 2012.
- Tajudeen Sowole, "Step Aside, Ferguson, African Art takes over Manchester", The Nigerian Guardian, 15 June 2012.
- Kate McCrickard, "Waste Management/Things Torn Apart", Art South Africa, Volume 9.4, June 2011.
- "With Metamorphoses, Okore returns to the UK", The Nigerian Guardian, 19 April 2011.
- A. M. Weaver, "Fragility, Elegance and Decay", Ceramics: Art and Perception, Issue 83, March 2011.
- McPhillip Nwachukwu, "Nigerian Art Market...., says Nnenna Okore", Vanguard, 25 November 2010.
- Jessica Hemmings, "Material Meaning", Wasafiri, Issue 63, 2010.
- Elizabeth Upper, "Into the Art of Africa", Above Magazine, Winter 2009/2010.
- Okwui Enwezor and Chika Okeke-Agulu, Contemporary African Art Since 1980, 2009.
- Chika Okeke-Agulu, "New Order", Arise Magazine, Issue 6, October 2009.
- Jessica Kronika, "Nnenna Okore's art .... recycled material installation", The Examiner, 11 August 2009.
- Mike Giuliano, "Visual Arts: Five artists 'paper' the arts center", Howard County Times, 30 July 2009.
- Albert Stabler, "Tom Torluemke and others at the Cultural Center", Proximity Magazine, 26 July 2009.
- Uzor Maxim Uzoatu, "Wakeful Souls", Next Newspaper, 10 July 2009.
- Vanessa Offiong, "From Rags to Riches with Art", Weekly Trust, June 2009.
- Victor Ehikhamenor, "The goddess of small things ...", Next Newspaper, 19 June 2009.
- Okechukwu Uwaezuoke, "Imitations of Nature", This Day, 20 June 2009.
- Chuka Nnabuife, "'Of Earth...' Nnenna Okore stages home show", Nigerian Compass, 16 June 2009.
- Jessica Hemmings, "Nnenna Okore: Ulukububa at October Gallery, London", Surface Design Journal, July edition, 2009.
- Emmanuel Anyifite, "Contemporary Art Auction in Lagos", Next Newspaper, 9 April 2009.
- Julian Roup, "Groundbreaking African Artists In Spotlight At First British Auction Of Contemporary African Art At Bonhams", Bonhams Headlines, March 2009.
- Simon de Burton, "Art of Africa", The Financial Times, 28 March 2009.
- Katy Donoghue, "Artist to Watch: Nnenna Okore", Whitewall Magazine, Spring Issue, 2009.
- Molara Wood, "Studio Visit with Nnenna Okore: Art from Discarded and Found Things", Next Newspaper, 8 February 2009.
- Bunmi Akpata-Ohohe, "Ulukububa: Infinite Flow", Africa Today, 3 December 2008.
- Polly Savage, "Introduction: Ulukububa-Infinite Flow", Exhibition Catalogue, London, 16 October – 6 December 2008.
- Roberta Smith, "Using Old Materials to Put a New Face on the Museum", New York Times, 26 September 2008.
- Barbara Murray, "Mind Openers-Women Artist in Africa", Farafina Magazine, No. 8, January 2007.
