= Evelyn Mase =

South African nurse (1922–2004)

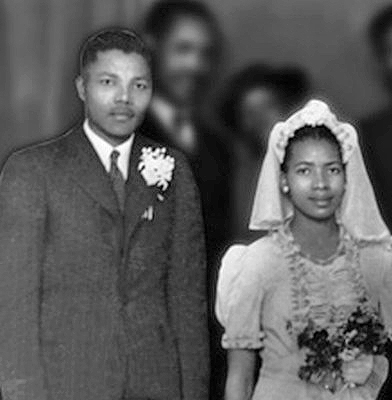
- Mase (right) with Mandela (left) on the wedding day of Walter and Albertina Sisulu in 1944
- Born: Evelyn Ntoko Mase; 18 May 1922; Engcobo, South Africa
- Died: 30 April 2004 (aged 81)
- Spouses: Nelson Mandela (m. 1944; div. 1958) Simon Rakeepile (m. 1998)
- Children: 4, including Makgatho Mandela and Makaziwe Mandela

Evelyn Ntoko Mase (18 May 1922 – 30 April 2004), later named Evelyn Rakeepile, was the first wife of the South African anti-apartheid activist and the future president Nelson Mandela, to whom she was married from 1944 to 1958. Mase was a nurse by profession.

Born in Engcobo, Transkei, Mase was orphaned as a child. She moved to Johannesburg to train as a nurse, and there met and married Mandela. Living together in Soweto, they raised four children, three of whom—Thembekile, Makgatho, and Makaziwe—survived into adulthood. She trained to be a midwife while working as a nurse. In the 1950s, her relationship with Mandela became strained. He was becoming increasingly involved in the African National Congress and its campaign against apartheid; Mase eschewed politics and became a Jehovah's Witness. She also accused him of adultery with several women, an accusation corroborated by later biographies, and of being physically abusive, something he always denied. They separated in 1956. She initially filed for divorce, but did not go through with the legal proceedings. In 1958, Mandela, who was hoping to marry Winnie Madikizela, obtained an uncontested divorce from Mase.

Taking the children, Mase moved to Cofimvaba and opened a grocery store. She generally avoided publicity, but spoke to South African reporters when Mandela was released from prison after 27 years in 1990. Deepening her involvement with the Jehovah's Witnesses, in 1998 she married a businessman, Simon Rakeepile. She died in 2004 following a respiratory illness. Her funeral attracted international media attention and was attended by Mandela, Winnie Madikizela-Mandela, and Mandela's third wife, Graça Machel.

== Early life ==
Evelyn Mase was born in 1922 in Engcobo, Transkei. Her father was a mineworker and her mother was his second wife; they had six children, three of whom died in infancy. Mase's father died when she was still a child. Mase's mother then died when she was 12, leaving her under the care of her older brother, Sam Mase. A devout Christian, Sam had a close friendship with former schoolmate Walter Sisulu; they were cousins, as their mothers were sisters. In 1928, Sisulu moved to the Soweto area of Johannesburg, obtaining a house in the Orlando East township. Sam joined him there and, becoming politicised, encouraged Sisulu to read left-wing literature.

In 1939, Evelyn joined her brother and Sisulu in Johannesburg. She trained as a nurse in the city's non-European hospital at Hillbrow, fulfilling the wishes of her late mother that she would enter that profession. There, she befriended Walter's girlfriend Albertina, whom he met in 1941 and married in 1944. Mase was a bridesmaid at the Sisulus' wedding. Writing in his later autobiography, Nelson Mandela recounted that the Sisulus treated Mase "as if she was a favorite daughter". At the hospital she worked alongside Rosemary Mda, the wife of anti-apartheid activist A. P. Mda.

== Marriage and life with Mandela ==
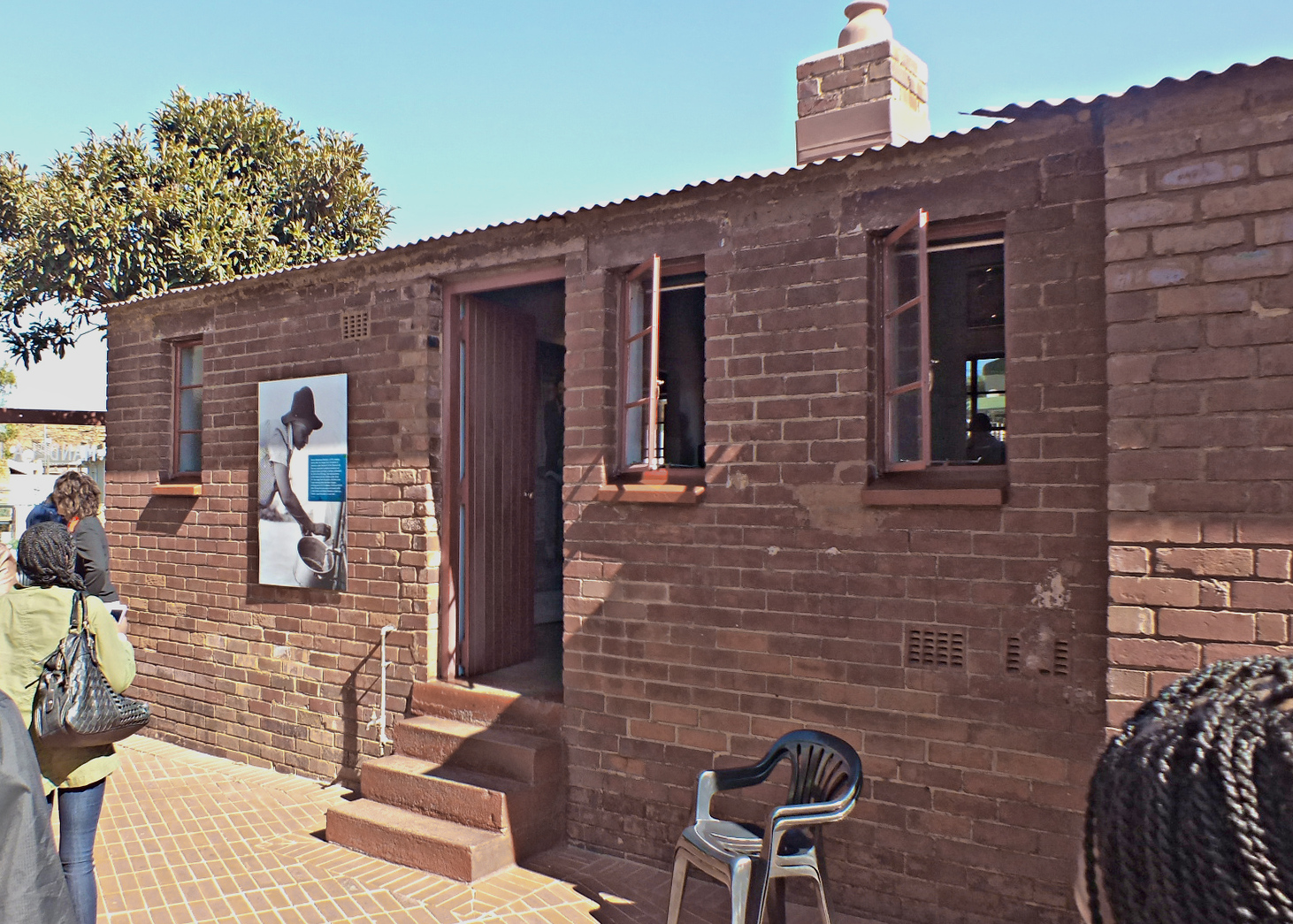
Mandela and Mase's home in the Johannesburg township of Soweto

When the Sisulus moved to a larger home, they gave their old house to Sam. Evelyn and Sam continued to visit the Sisulus at their new house, 7372 Orlando West, meeting their lodger, Nelson Mandela. At this point he was studying law at the University of Witwatersrand. Mandela later related that at that time, Mase was "a quiet, pretty girl from the countryside". She later informed Fatima Meer that "I think I loved him the first time I saw him", and they started dating after a few days. Within several months, Mandela proposed marriage to Mase, delighting her brother and the Sisulus. Their civil wedding took place on 5 October 1944 at Johannesburg's Native Commissioner's Court. There were no traditional Xhosa elements in the ceremony; they could not afford a wedding feast.

The newly married couple had little money; Mase earned 18 pounds a month from nursing while Mandela worked part-time. They moved into a room at the house of Evelyn's sister Kate, where they lived alongside her husband Mgudlwa, a clerk at City Deep Mines, and two children. They did not pay rent, but shared what money they had. Mase later claimed that their relationship in these early years was happy, commenting that "Everyone we knew said that we made a very good couple."

The house itself was identical to hundreds of others built on postage-stamp sized plots on dirt roads. It had the same standard tin roof, the same cement floor, a narrow kitchen and a bucket toilet at the back... It was the opposite of grand but it was my first true home of my own and I was mightily proud. A man is not a man until he has a house of his own.

— Mandela, on 8115 Orlando West

Mase became pregnant, and on 23 February 1946 she gave birth to a son, Thembekile, at Bertram's Nursing Home. Requiring greater space, the couple moved to a two-roomed house at 719 Orlando East for several months before relocating to 8115 Orlando West circa early 1947, where they paid rent of 17 shillings and 6 pence a month. The accommodation was basic, with a cement floor, tin roof, and a bucket toilet; it was in the black residential area that later became known as Soweto. Both Mandela's mother Nosekeni, and his sister Leabie, came to live with them; Nosekeni got on well with Evelyn.

Mase gave birth to her second child, a daughter named Makaziwe, in 1947. Makaziwe was in poor health and died nine months later. Mase later noted the cause of death as meningitis. A third child, the son Makgatho Lewanika, was born in August 1950.

In 1953, Mase decided to upgrade her nursing certificate so that she could become a midwife, enrolling at the King Edward VIII Hospital in Durban. This meant that she was away from her home for several months, during which time her children were cared for by Mandela's mother and sister. Mandela visited her in Durban at least once, staying in the home of Fatima and Ismail Meer. Fatima later recalled Mase as being "a simple person, a good person, nice, very sociable; very easy to get to know and very easy going". When Mase returned to Johannesburg in late 1953, she was pregnant, subsequently giving birth to a second daughter, whom the Mandelas also named Makaziwe in honour of their first daughter. This daughter's birth reaffirmed Mase's faith in the Anglican beliefs that had dwindled over the course of her marriage. She gave this new child the second name of Phumla ("God has rested her soul").

=== Growing marital tensions ===
I could not put my finger on it at first, nobody would tell me. Then the gossip reached me. Nelson, I was told, was having an affair with a woman member of the ANC [Lillian Ngoyi]. I knew this woman and admired and liked her. She visited us often and I got on well with her. I did not believe the rumour at first but, unable to bear it, I turned to Nelson. Who else could I have turned to? He was angry that I questioned his fidelity. The woman was an important ANC leader and that was all there was to it, he said. The gossip continued and there were those who tried to console me by claiming he was bewitched. There was also another woman [Ruth Mompati] and this one started coming home, walking into our bedroom, following him to the bathroom.

— Evelyn Mase, on her husband's adultery

Mandela became increasingly interested in political activism in the early 1950s, adopting an African nationalist ideology and joining the banned African National Congress (ANC). In his autobiography, published in 1995, Mandela alleged that Mase wanted him to abandon this activism, resulting in them having many arguments about his political activities. Leabie also noted that Evelyn "didn't want to hear a thing about politics". Mase was not wholly apolitical; she attended meetings of the ANC Women's League with Albertina, dressing in the colours of the ANC (green, black, and yellow) for many of their events. She also joined the nursing union.

While Mandela became increasingly politicised, Mase converted to the Jehovah's Witnesses and publicly distributed their magazine, The Watchtower. She also made her two sons distribute copies in the township around their home. Mandela later noted that Mase urged him to convert, but that he refused. He recalled that although he "found some aspects of the Watch Tower's system to be interesting and worthwhile, I could not and did not share her devotion. There was an obsessional element to it that put me off. From what I could discern, her faith taught passivity and submissiveness in the face of oppression, something I could not accept." Mandela also claimed that they argued over their respective attempts to promote their views to their children; Mandela encouraging them to embrace African nationalist opinions and Mase seeking to convert them into Jehovah's Witnesses.

In his autobiography, Mandela claimed that he would often attend political meetings late at night and that this led Mase to accuse him of having an extra-marital affair. He implied that these accusations were untrue. This account, written shortly after his release from a 27-year imprisonment but before his election as President of South Africa, may have aimed to avoid damaging his heroic reputation. Later biographers highlighted further evidence that suggested Mase's accusation of adultery was correct; Mandela admitted to fellow activist Mac Maharaj that during the early 1950s he had led "a thoroughly immoral life". Several biographers, including David James Smith and Martin Meredith, argued that while married to Mase, Mandela was having affairs with both his secretary, Ruth Mompati, and with the ANC activist Lillian Ngoyi. At one point, Mase warned Mandela that if he ever brought Mompati back to their house again she would pour boiling water over her. There were rumours among those close to Mandela that Mompati bore him a child; Smith believed that Mompati's son, Mompati Neo Matsuone, who was born in April 1955, was Mandela's. Mase told Walter Sisulu about the affairs; this angered Mandela, who did not want news of his infidelity shared with others. Nosekeni disapproved of her son's behaviour and because of this, Smith argued, she returned to the Transkei. Leabie suspected that the marriage was being damaged by umuthi (witchcraft).

According to Mandela's autobiography, in 1955 Mase presented him with an ultimatum: he had to either give up his political activism or she would leave him. He chose the latter option. The Sisulus were upset by this, and Walter tried talking to Mandela about it; this angered him. According to his autobiography, in December 1956, the police arrested Mandela and imprisoned him for two weeks before he was allowed out on bail. Returning home, he found that Mase had left him and taken their children with her. At this point, Mandela stated, Mase temporarily moved in with her brother. Scrutinising this account of events, Smith noted that this chronology did not match that from other sources, and that, as far as he could tell, "that scene [of Mandela coming out of prison to find his wife had left him] never happened".

=== Divorce ===
Records indicate that it was Mase who initiated divorce proceedings. She lodged a particular of claims report at the Native District Court in May 1956, in which she stated that she was seeking a divorce because Mandela had repeatedly physically assaulted her. In her report, Mase made no allegation of adultery against her husband. Instead, she claimed that Mandela had deserted her in February 1955 and then physically assaulted her in July, August, and October of that year, and again in February 1956 after she refused to leave their house. She added that in March 1956 he had threatened to kill her with an axe unless she left his house. She stated that she then took refuge with a neighbour before moving in with her brother. Mase's claims of assault were never subjected to scrutiny in court; Smith later noted that it is "entirely possible that Evelyn imagined all those stories of assault, out of malice or revenge, but the fact she alluded to them outside the divorce papers and that the neighbours were involved, lends at least some credence to her account". As part of her claim, Mase sought custody of her children, formal separation from Mandela, and a £50 monthly maintenance payment from him.

Perhaps if I had been patient, if I had tried to understand why he had turned away from me, perhaps things would have been different and I would still be his wife. He was the only man I ever loved. He was a wonderful husband and a wonderful father.

— Evelyn Mase to Fatima Meer

Mandela responded to Mase's report with his own petition, filed in August 1956. There, he denied her claims of assault. He also informed his friend, the ANC activist Ahmed Kathrada, that the only time he had used physical force against his wife was when she was threatening him with a red hot poker and he had to disarm her. In his 1956 petition, Mandela did not seek custody of his daughter but did so for his two sons, arguing that they would be better off living with him as their school was only 150 yards from his home, as opposed to two miles from Sam Mase's house. He also argued that, as his mother was living with him, he was in a better position to care for his sons than Mase, who was working full-time. He also claimed that his children were presently looking dirty and neglected at Sam Mase's overcrowded home, where Evelyn and her children were cohabiting with Sam, his wife, and their four children.

Mase and Mandela separated, although the former continued to regard herself as married. Before the hearing, Mandela received custody of their sons with visitation by Mase. In November 1956, Mase withdrew her petition for divorce, for reasons unknown. Smith thought that Mase was hoping for reconciliation with her husband, while Mandela wanted to avoid a public divorce hearing which would damage his standing in the ANC. Their children went back and forth between the two homes over the coming months. Mandela later acknowledged that their children were emotionally traumatised by the separation.

After Mandela met Winnie Madikizela and embarked on a relationship with her, he filed for a divorce from Mase, which Mase did not contest. Their marriage was formally dissolved on 18 March 1958. Mase was granted custody of all three children; Mandela agreed to pay her a £50 lump sum and then a monthly maintenance stipend of £15. Mase took much of the furniture from their Orlando home and the title deeds to a plot of land Mandela owned in Umtata. In his autobiography, Mandela noted that his first wife "was a very good woman, charming, strong and faithful, and a fine mother. I never lost my respect for her, but in the end we could not make our marriage work." His close comrade, Maharaj, noted that Mandela always spoke respectfully of Mase after their divorce. Similarly, Mase told Fatima Meer that Mandela had been "a wonderful husband and a wonderful father".

== Post-divorce ==
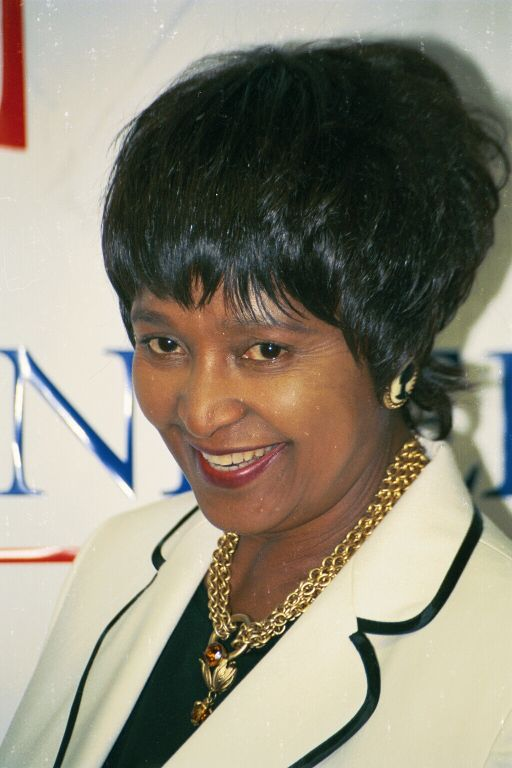
Nelson Mandela's second wife, Winnie (pictured), related that despite rumours of discord between them, she had a good relationship with Mase

With her children, Evelyn moved to Cofimvaba in the Eastern Cape, where she opened a grocery shop. She was assisted in obtaining the shop from its white owners by Kaiser Matanzima, a local politician who was Mandela's kinsman. When it came to raising her children, Mase was a disciplinarian influenced by her religious values; she for instance forbade them to watch films. After Mandela was arrested in August 1962, he was interned in a Johannesburg prison. Mase travelled there to meet with him, but Mandela refused to see her. Mase's son, Thembekile, became a bootlegger and ran an illegal shebeen; Mase disapproved of this but did not turn down the money it generated, which helped to pay for Makgatho and Makaziwe's education in Swaziland. Due to the apartheid restrictions, Mase could not visit her children when they were studying there. In January 1969, when he was 24, Thembekile was killed in a car accident while driving home from Durban. From prison, Mandela wrote Mase a letter trying to comfort her. This was the first contact Mase had had with Mandela since their divorce.

Winnie Mandela later claimed that despite rumours of discord with Mase, the two had a good relationship. She said that she had tried to encourage good relations with Mase and her children, telling her own two children, Zenani and Zindziswa, that they should refer to her predecessor as "Mama Evelyn". Some members of Mase's family believed that Winnie was preventing them from receiving financial support that Mandela had arranged for them; moreover, some blamed Winnie for breaking up Mandela's first marriage, although Mandela had already separated from Mase before meeting Winnie. There remained some ill-feeling between Mase's family and Winnie's into later decades. The former felt that they had been disposed and written out of public narratives about Mandela's life; the latter felt that Mase's children sometimes used Mandela's name for their own financial and political advancement. Mase's children also expressed some bitterness to Mandela himself.

Amid growing speculation that Mandela would be released from prison in 1990, Mase pinned a notice to the gate of her house asking media to leave her alone. One reporter, Fred Bridgland, did manage to obtain an interview. Mase was angry at the way Mandela's release was being anticipated, believing that it was being treated like the second coming of Christ and proclaiming: "How can a man who has committed adultery and left his wife and children be Christ? The whole world worships Nelson too much. He is only a man." After Mandela became South Africa's first black president following the 1994 general election, Mase again spoke to a journalist, noting that when she was going door to door to spread the Jehovah's Witness message, she often saw Mandela's picture adorning people's walls. She stated that Mandela's "strength has come from God" and that "God uses people to do his work even if they are not righteous."

In 1998 Mase married the retired Soweto businessman Simon Rakeepile, who was also a Jehovah's Witness. He insisted that she took his surname, perhaps because he did not want to live under the shadow of the famous Mandela name. In later years, Mase became a Pioneer, a position within the Jehovah's Witness organisation necessitating greater commitment to the religion. She died on 30 April 2004, having suffered from a respiratory illness. She was survived by Makaziwe and Makgatho, and by her second husband. Her body was buried at West Park Cemetery. Mandela attended the funeral along with Winnie Madikizela and his third wife, Graça Machel. In March 2009, the Soweto Heritage Trust opened the township home where Mandela and Mase had lived together as a tourist attraction named Mandela House.
