= Sefako Makgatho =

South African politician

Sefako Mapogo Makgatho (1861 - 23 May 1951) was a South African an anti apartheid activist who played an important role in strengthening the SANNC which later became the ANC and later became its president.

== Early years ==
Born at GaMphahlele, in the Pietersburg district in the South African Republic (now Limpopo). He was the son of Chief Kgorutlhe Josiah Makgatho of the Makgatho chieftaincy at GaMphahlele.

=== Political career ===
Before embarking on a political career, Makgato was a teacher and a journalist. Makgatho joined the South African Native National Congress (SANNC) later renamed the African National Congress (ANC). He became its president at the tail end of World War I, in 1917.

As President of the SANNC, Makgatho worked hard to ensure that the movement remained a key factor in the struggle against segregation. It was during Makgatho’s presidency that the ANC is thought to have become radicalized. In 1917 and 1920 Makgatho ensured that the ANC supported the municipal workers strike and the miners’ strike in Johannesburg.

In 1923 he was forced to step down and was replaced by Z. K. Mahabane. Makgatho remained President of the Transvaal ANC until the mid 1930s and continued to exert considerable influence in the movement.

He died on 23 May 1951 aged 90; the same year, Nelson Mandela's son from his first marriage with his wife Evelyn was born. In paying tribute to Sefako Makgatho, Mandela named his son after him.

== Legacy ==
Sefako Makgatho Health Sciences University was named after him. Makgatho was posthumously awarded the Order of Luthuli in gold by the South African government.
