= List of Council of Ministers of Mozambique, 1984 =

The following is a list of the Council of Ministers of Mozambique in 1984.

- President: Samora Moises Machel
- Ministers-
- Agriculture: Joao dos Santos Ferreira
- Defense: Alberto Joaquim Chipande
- Economic affairs in the presidency: Jacinto Veloso
- Education and culture: Graça Machel
- Finance: Rui Baltazar dos Santos Alves
- Foreign affairs: Joaquim Alberto Chissano
- Foreign trade: Joaquim Ribiero de Carvalho
- Health: Pascoal Macumbi
- Industry and power: Antonio Lima Rodriques Branco
- Information: Jose Luis Cabaco
- Interior: Armando Guebuza
- Internal trade: Manuel Jorge Aranda da Silva
- Justice: Jose Oscar Monteiro
- Mineral resources: Jose Carlos Lobo
- Planning: Mario da Graça Machungo
- Ports, railways and merchant marine: Luis Alcantara Santos
- Posts and telecommunications: Rui Lousa
- Public works: Júlio Eduardo Zamith Carrilho
- Security: Mariano de Araújo Matsinhe
- Governor of the Bank of Mozambique: Prakash Ratilal
- Vice minister of defense and chief of the General staff of the army: Sebastiao Marcos Mabote
