= Zenani Mandela-Dlamini =

South African diplomat

Her Excellency Her Royal Highness Princess Zenani Mandela-Dlamini
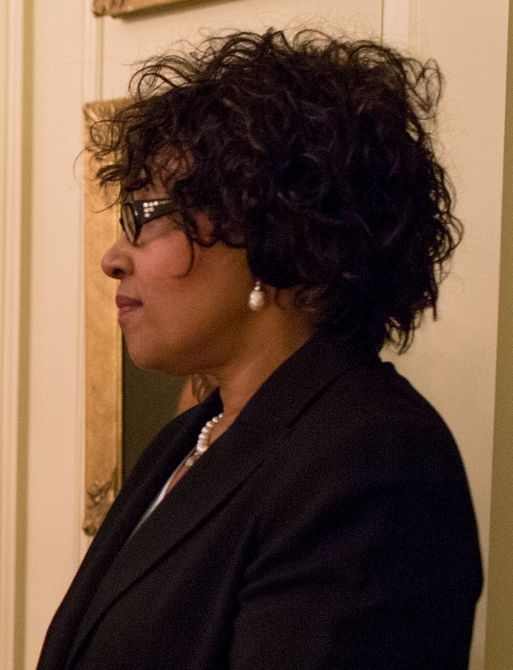
- Princess Zenani Mandela-Dlamini

Ambassador of South Africa to South Korea
- Incumbent
- Assumed office October 2019
- President: Cyril Ramaphosa

High Commissioner of South Africa to Mauritius
- In office May 2017 – October 2019
- President: Cyril Ramaphosa

Ambassador of South Africa to Argentina
- In office October 2012 – May 2017
- President: Jacob Zuma
- Preceded by: Tony Leon
- Succeeded by: Vacant

First Lady of South Africa
- In office 10 May 1994 – 18 July 1998 Serving with Zindzi Mandela (sister)
- President: Nelson Mandela (father)
- Preceded by: Marike de Klerk
- Succeeded by: Graça Machel (step-mother)

Personal details
- Born: Zenani Mandela; 4 February 1959 (age 67)
- Spouse: Prince Thumbumuzi Dlamini (m. 1977; sep. 1990)
- Children: 4, including Prince Zinhle
- Parent(s): Nelson Mandela; Winnie Madikizela-Mandela
- Relatives: Zindzi Mandela-Hlongwane (sister); Thembekile Mandela (half-brother); Makgatho Mandela (half-brother); Makaziwe Mandela (half-sister); Prince Cedza Dlamini (step-son); Zoleka Mandela (niece)

Princess Zenani Mandela-Dlamini (née Mandela; born 4 February 1959) is a South African diplomat and traditional aristocrat. She is the sister-in-law of the King of Eswatini, Mswati III, and the daughter of Nelson Mandela and his former wife, Winnie Mandela.

== Early life ==
Zenani Mandela was born into a family of chieftains. Her father, Nelson, was a direct descendant of the holders of the kingship of the Thembu people and was himself the heir to the chieftaincy of Mvezo. His grandson, Zenani's nephew Mandla, eventually succeeded to the latter title.

She was nearly born in prison, as Winnie Mandela was arrested close to her birth in 1959, and when she was four her father was sent to prison, where he would stay for the next 27 years. Not until 1974, when she was 15 years old and could visit him, did she know about the arrest.

== Education ==
Mandela-Dlamini studied at Waterford Kamhlaba United World College of Southern Africa and science at Boston University. It was there that she first met Prince Thumbumuzi Dlamini of Swaziland (an elder brother of the reigning monarch of Swaziland, Mswati III and of Queen Mantfombi of the Zulus), who was studying science at the same university. The two married in 1973 and had four children – daughters Zaziwe (1977) and Zamaswazi (1979) and sons Zinhle (1980) and Zozuko (1992) – and six grandchildren, but are currently separated. Her husband had several other children from a previous marriage, Prince Cedza Dlamini being one of them. They are co-owners of Mandela, Dlamini and Associates (International Business Consultants).

== Later activity ==
Mandela-Dlamini was appointed ambassador for South Africa to Argentina in July 2012, (taking office in October), becoming the first of Mandela's children to enter public service; she succeeded retiring diplomat and former opposition leader Tony Leon. She served in this position until May 2017, when she was appointed South African high commissioner to Mauritius. Princess Zenani Mandela-Dlamini was appointed as the South African Ambassador to South Korea in October 2019. In December 2024, Princess Zenani Mandela-Dlamini was appointed as South Africa's Ambassador to Sweden.

After Mandela was elected president and his divorce to Winnie, Zenani was chosen to accompany her father to his inauguration and become the stand-in First Lady of South Africa until her father remarried on his 80th birthday to former Mozambique first lady Graça Machel.
