= Josina Z. Machel =

Mozambican activist (born 1976)

- Born: Josina Ziyaya Machel; April 1976 (age 50)
- Citizenship: Mozambique
- Education: University of Cape Town
- Alma mater: London School of Economics
- Occupation: Activist
- Organization: Kuhluka Movement
- Parents: Samora Machel (father); Graça Machel (mother)
- Relatives: Nelson Mandela (step-father)
- Website: josinazmachel.com

Josina Ziyaya Machel (born April 1976) is a Mozambican human rights activist. She featured in the BBC's 100 Women in 2020.

== Biography ==
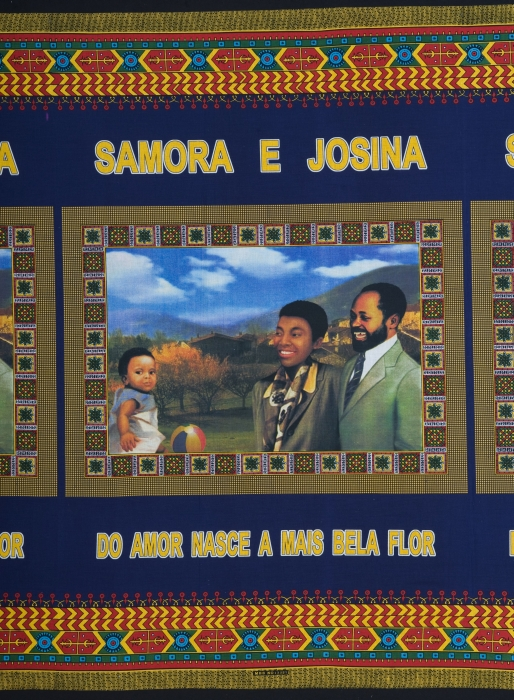
Machel family depicted on a capulana (Tropenmuseum Collection)

Machel was born in Maputo in April 1976. She is the daughter of former Mozambican President Samora Machel and Mozambican politician and social activist Graça Machel, who later married South African politician Nelson Mandela. Her father had chosen the name of his first wife, the feminist activist Josina Machel, as a tribute to her. Machel's father died in a plane crash, which some consider to have been murder, when she was 10 years old. After her mother and Nelson Mandela began a relationship, Machel moved to South Africa and, following their marriage, became Mandela's stepdaughter.

Machel studied Sociology and Political Science at the University of Cape Town, then studied for an MSc from the London School of Economics, in the same discipline. Her MSc dissertation was entitled 'AIDS: Disease of Poverty or Patriarchy'. One output of her research was the publication of the article 'Unsafe sexual behaviour among schoolgirls in Mozambique: a matter of gender and class', which was published in the journal Reproductive Health Matters.

== Awards and honours ==
Machel has been nominated for several awards and honours, including:

- "Trailblazer Award", awarded by American SOHO (Saving Orphans through Healthcare and Outreach) in 2016.
- Inaugural member of the Mama Albertina Sisulu 100 Women of Fortitude Group.
- 100 Women List, chosen by the BBC and published on 23 November 2020.
