= Ndaba Mandela =

Grandson of Nelson Mandela

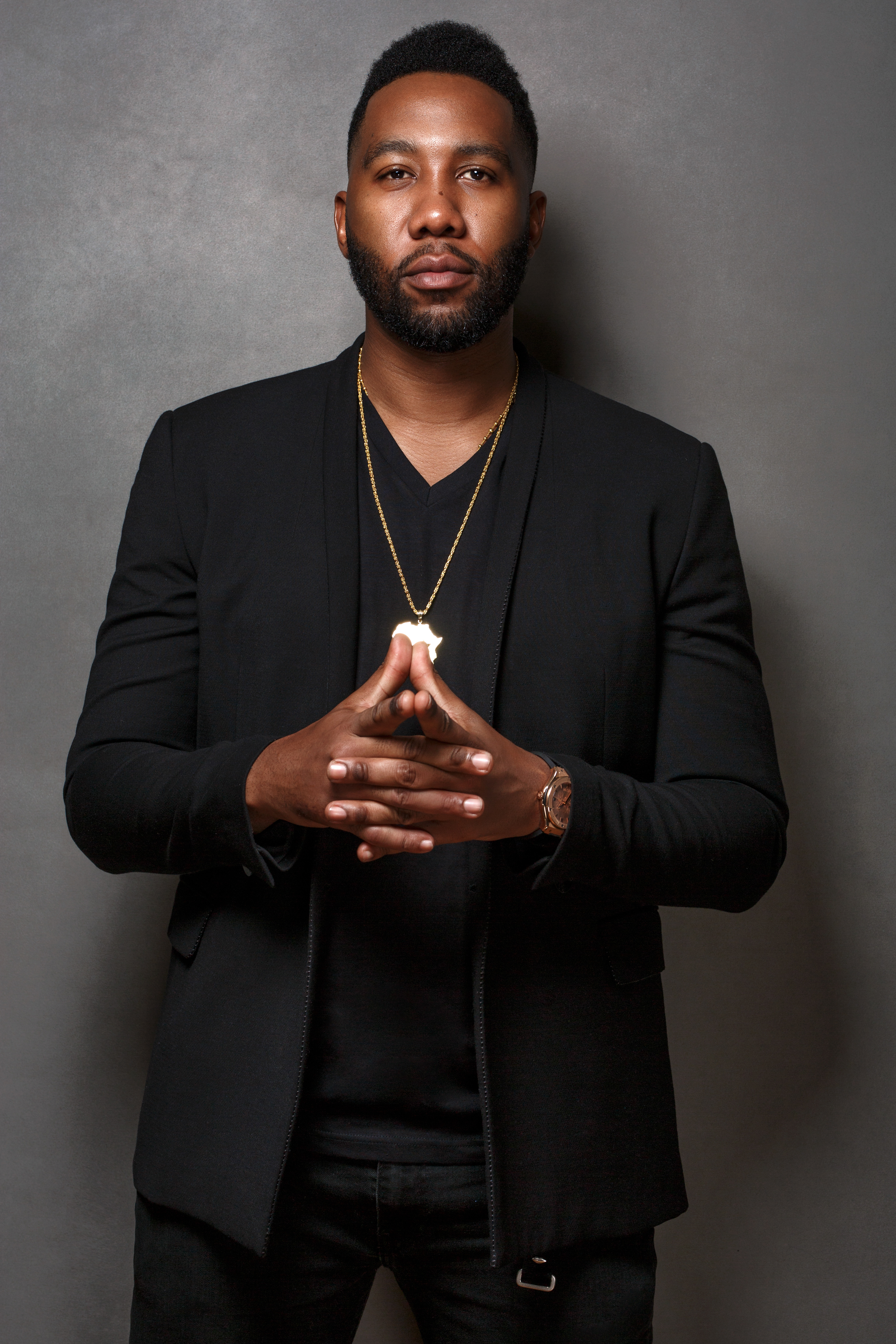
- Born: Ndaba Thembekile Zweliyajika Mandela; 23 December 1982 (age 43); Soweto, Johannesburg, South Africa
- Education: Bachelor's Degree from the University of Pretoria in 2008.
- Children: 2
- Parents: Makgatho Mandela; Zondi Mandela
- Relatives: Nelson Mandela (grandfather); Mandla Mandela (half-brother)
- Website: mifh.org

Ndaba Thembekile Zweliyajika Mandela (born 23 December 1982) is an author, mentor, spokesperson, entrepreneur, political consultant, and the grandson of Nelson Mandela. He was born in Soweto, South Africa.

Mandela is currently the co-founder and chairman of the Mandela Institute for Humanity.

He is active in keeping the legacy of his grandfather alive, and introducing Nelson Mandela to a younger generation. He is the co-founder and chairman of Africa Rising Foundation. He is also the founder of the Mandela Project. He was part of the team for the Mandela Centenary in 2018.

From 2014 - 2021 Ndaba was Vice President of the Pan-African Youth Council which is now called the Pan African Youth Parliament which works closely with the African Union.

He is the longest serving global ambassador for UNAIDS, a specialized agency of the United Nations that campaigns to end the HIV/AIDS epidemic. Both of his parents died from the disease.

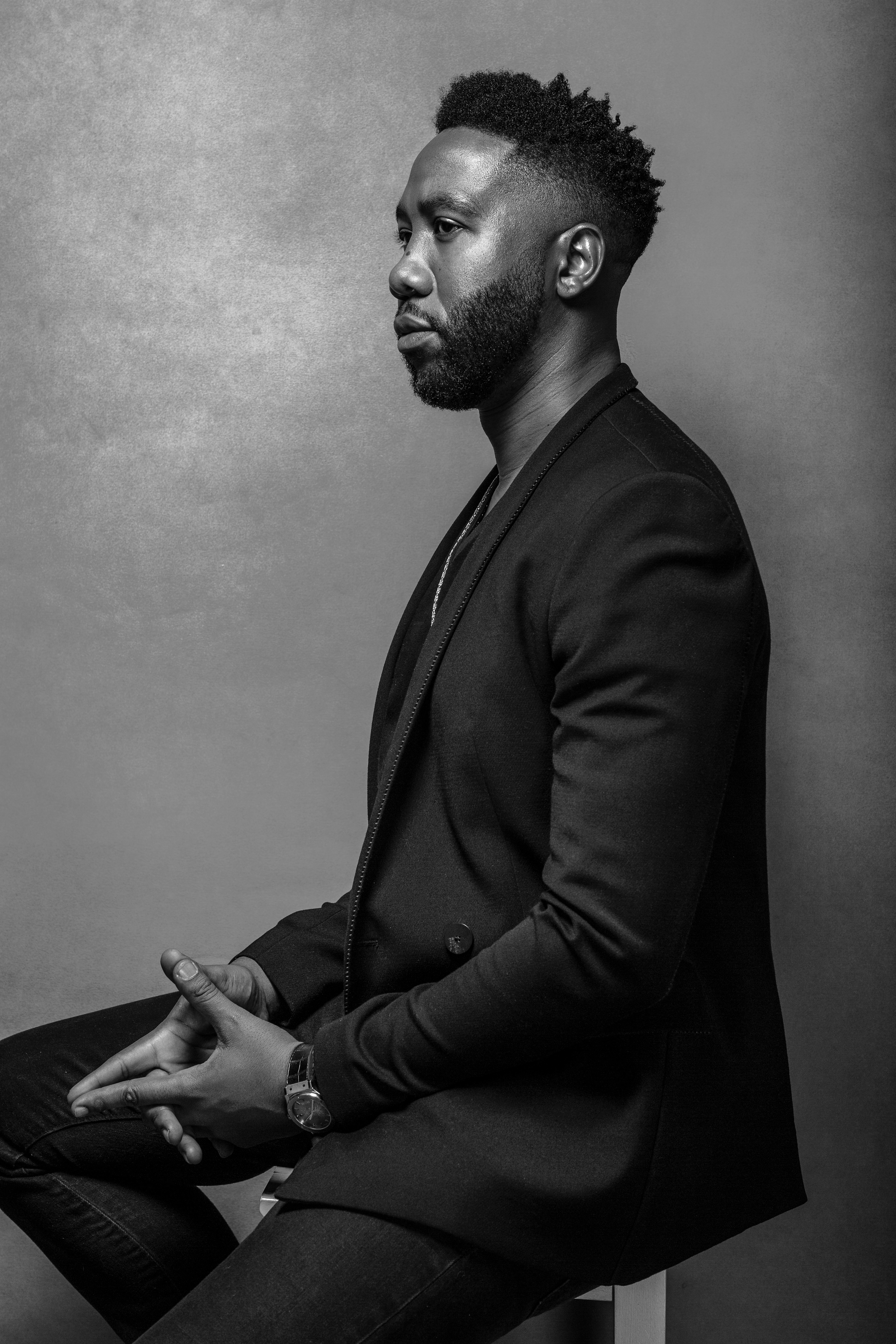

== Early life ==
Ndaba Mandela was born into a family of chieftains. His grandfather Nelson was both a direct descendant of the holders of the kingship of the Thembu people and heir to the chieftaincy of Mvezo in his own right. The latter dignity is currently held by Ndaba's elder half-brother Mandla.

This notwithstanding, Ndaba grew up in what can be called a broken home. His father Makgatho Mandela grew up without a father. Nelson Mandela was imprisoned while his family was growing up, and he became a street hustler in Soweto. After Ndaba was born, his family moved to the Eastern Cape. He spent the first years of his schooling in a small town called Cofimvaba. He was seven years old when he met his grandfather Nelson Mandela. Mandela had been imprisoned on Robben Island. Ndaba was eleven years old when he went to live with his grandfather. He spent two decades living with him - being cared for, and then caring for his grandfather.

== Career ==
Ndaba majored in political science and international relations at the University of Pretoria in South Africa.

He has worked for the Japanese Embassy as a political consultant.

Africa Rising was founded to promote a positive image of Africa. Ndaba was featured in an online post by BET in which he spoke about his foundation, Africa Rising. Ndaba says his foundation aims to publicise a positive image of Africa through programming, films, media and social interaction, to change the mindset of young Africans and the world at large.

In 2014 Ndaba was named one of the "28 Men of Change", by BET. The Men of Change is in honor of America's Black History Month. It honors Black men that have excelled in industries or projects that promote black brilliance.

He published his first book in June 2018 titled Going to the Mountain: Life Lessons from My Grandfather, Nelson Mandela. He says that his grandfather taught him to create their own legacies and to give back to society. Ndaba says about his book, that he has taken the life lessons that his grandfather taught him and some of his own to relate to a younger audience. So that people can understand his grandfather's values.

In 2018 Ndaba partnered with Prince Harry, and Sir Elton John to launch a campaign to raise awareness about HIV and AIDS. They kicked off the global campaign at the 22nd International AIDS Conference in Amsterdam. In an interview with the Hill at the Library of Congress, June 2018, Ndaba is quoted as saying why he wrote the book, “I wanted people to know Nelson Mandela outside of being a statesman, outside of being this great iconic leader that they know and just to know him at the human level as a granddad."
