= Ndileka Mandela =

Social activist in South Africa

Ndileka Mandela (born 22 February 1965) is a social activist, former ICU nurse, and the head of rural upliftment organisation the Thembekile Mandela Foundation.

She is the first born of Madiba "Thembi" Thembekile Mandela (1945–1969; Nelson Mandela's first born) who died through car accident while his father was in prison; sister of Nandi Mandela (born 1968) and the eldest grandchild of Nelson Mandela.

In 2017 Mandela became the first member of her family to reject the party of her grandfather, the African National Congress.

In October 2017, as part of the #MeToo campaign to denounce sexual violence, Mandela disclosed for the first time that she had been raped by her then partner in her own bed, five years before. She later said she had been following in her grandfather's footsteps, who had disclosed the HIV status of a family member, in order to combat stigma and call for concerted action against sexual violence.

In response another grandchild of Nelson Mandela, Mandla Mandela, issued a statement praising his cousin and calling on others to follow her example.

In mid-2018, amid a debate on whether Nelson Mandela had been a "sell out", Ndileka Mandela came out in defence of her grandfather's legacy.

In 2023, she was co-author with Aaron Friedland, of the children's book The Walking School Bus, which was included among the 41 titles selected for the 2024 USBBY Outstanding International Books List. In announcing its publication, The New York Times described the story as a "moving tale of two enterprising siblings determined to find a safe way to get to school."
