= Makaziwe Mandela =

Daughter of Nelson Mandela (born 1954)

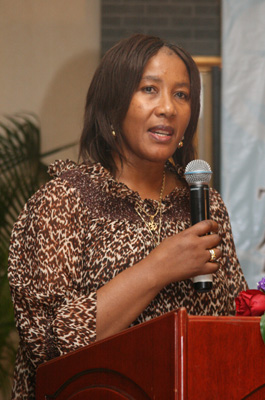
- Mandela-Amuah talking in a press conference during Miss World 2007 in Sanya, China
- Born: Pumla Makaziwe Mandela; 1 May 1954 (age 72); Johannesburg, South Africa
- Education: Waterford Kamhlaba; University of Fort Hare; University of Massachusetts (PhD)
- Spouse(s): Camagu Balfour (divorced); Isaac Amuah
- Children: 4, inc. Tukwini Mandela
- Parent(s): Nelson Mandela; Evelyn Mase
- Relatives: Thembekile Mandela (brother); Makgatho Mandela (brother); Zenani Mandela-Dlamini (half-sister); Zindzi Mandela-Hlongwane (half-sister)
- Website: doctormandela.com

Pumla Makaziwe "Maki" Mandela-Amuah (born 1 May 1954) is the daughter of South African anti-apartheid revolutionary Nelson Mandela and his first wife Evelyn Mase.

== Early life and education ==
Makaziwe Mandela was born into a family of chieftains. Her father Nelson was a direct descendant of the holders of the kingship of the Thembu people and was himself the heir of the chieftaincy of Mvezo. His grandson, Makaziwe's nephew Mandla, eventually succeeded to the latter title.

She is named after her older sister, born in 1947, who died aged just nine months. Of the four children born to Nelson and Evelyn Mandela, Makaziwe is the only one still living.

She received her secondary education at Waterford Kamhlaba UWC of Southern Africa, before going to the University of Fort Hare in South Africa. In 1993, she earned a PhD in Anthropology at the University of Massachusetts, in Amherst, Massachusetts.

== Career ==
She has held senior posts at the University of the Witwatersrand and the Development Bank of Southern Africa, and now heads the Industrial Development Group (IDG), with interests in mining and petroleum. For 2022, African Fashion Gate has conferred La Moda Veste la Pace Award on Makaziwe Mandela (Maki) for consistently and constantly holding to the ideals of her father, Nobel Peace Prize-winner Nelson Rolihlahla Mandela, including liberty, respect for one's neighbour, and the fight against discrimination and democracy, though engagement in Nozala, a female investment group for the economic emancipation of women in her country. The awards ceremony, was celebrated in Rome at the seat of the Italian delegation of the European Commission.

== Personal life ==
She was married to Camagu Balfour, with whom she has a daughter, Tukwini Mandela (b. 1974), and a son, Dumani Mandela (b. 1976). They were later divorced. She is married to Dr. Isaac Amuah, who is of Ghanaian origin, with whom she has two more children, son Kweku Amuah and daughter Adjoa Amuah.
