= Mandla Mandela =

South African politician (born 1974)

Chief Mandla Mandela MP
- Born: Zwelivelile Mandela; 21 June 1974 (age 51); Orlando East, Soweto, South Africa
- Education: Rhodes University (B.A.)
- Occupations: Tribal chief, politician
- Title: Chief of Mvezo Traditional Council
- Political party: African National Congress
- Spouses: Tando Mabunu / Nkosikazi Nodayimani Mandela (m. 2004; div. 2018) Anaïs Grimaud / Nkosikazi Nobubele Mandela (m. 2010; sep. 2012) Mbali Makhathini / Nkosikazi Nodiyala Mandela (m. 2011) Nkosikazi Rabia Nosekeni Clarke-Mandela (m. 2016)
- Children: 3
- Parents: Makgatho Mandela (father); Rose Rayne Perry (mother)
- Relatives: Nelson Mandela (grandfather); Evelyn Mase (grandmother); Ndaba Mandela (half-brother); Makaziwe Mandela (aunt); Tukwini Mandela (aunt); Others
- Family: Mandela family

Nkosi Zwelivelile "Mandla" Mandela MP (born 21 June 1974) is the tribal chief of the Mvezo Traditional Council and the grandson of Nelson Mandela.

== Succession to the chieftaincy ==
His father, Makgatho Mandela, died in 2005, which paved his way to the headship of the clan. As the tribe did not discuss electing a member from the Mandela family until 2007, he was chosen as successor. Nelson Mandela had given up the right of Thembu leader nearly 70 years prior to fight white rule in South Africa. As the tribe now looked to him to reclaim his title, he suggested his grandson assume the role. When the younger Mandela became chief in 2007, he was only 32 years old and most of his duties were said to involve tribal ceremonies, settling disputes among clan members, and representing the tribe on political issues.

== Career and education ==
Mandela has been a member of parliament for the African National Congress since the 2009 election.

Prior to both his succession to the chieftaincy and his election to parliament, he attended Waterford Kamhlaba, a United World College in Swaziland (now Eswatini), until 1995. He graduated from Rhodes University with a degree in Politics in 2007.

== Personal life ==
His first wife was Princess Tando Mandela, née Mabunu of the Madiba clan. They married in June 2004 in both a civil ceremony and a traditional ceremony. She was then proclaimed Princess Nodayimani Mandela, a title given to her by President Nelson Rolihlahla Mandela; this was the only marriage Madiba attended personally. They were accused of incest due to their shared membership of the Thembu Madiba clan. Despite this, traditional ceremonies were nevertheless observed. Princess Nodayimani is known as the Spear Wife. After a process that began in 2009, they finalized their divorce in 2017.

His second wife was Anaïs Grimaud, a French citizen born in 1990 in Réunion, who changed her name to Chieftess Nobubele. They married in March 2010 in a traditional ceremony. She gave birth in September 2011 to Qheya II Zanethemba Mandela, who was presented to his great-grandfather Nelson Mandela at a naming ceremony in Qunu. In August 2012, Chief Mandela denied paternity, claiming it was the result of an affair with his brother.

His third wife was Mbali Makhathini (or, as she is otherwise styled, Chieftess Nodiyala Mandela), whom he married on 24 December 2011 at Mvezo. The marriage ended without children, and Makhathini later remarried and has a son from her second marriage.

On 6 February 2016, Chief Mandela married his fourth wife, Rabia Clarke, in an Islamic ceremony in Cape Town. She is now styled Chieftess Rabia Nosekeni Clarke-Mandela socially. Clarke comes from a Muslim household in the suburbs of Cape Town, and Mandela converted to Islam two months prior to the wedding in order to marry her. The couple have three children.

Chief Mandela practices the Thembu and Muslim traditions concurrently.

== Views ==
During a conference in Dakar, Senegal, hosted by the Pan African Palestinian Solidarity Network, Mandela placed the blame for the Russian invasion of Ukraine to "neo-Nazis", Israel, and NATO.

Mandela joined the 2024 Gaza freedom flotilla. His Twitter account was suspended after writing about the flotilla.

In October 2024, the United Kingdom denied Mandela a visa over his "support for Hamas" and his attendance at the funeral of its leader, Ismael Haniyeh. On his personal social media account, he has expressed support for the October 7 attacks. In October 2025, Mandla Mandela, who was part of the people sailing to Gaza on a boat was arrested by Israeli forces who intercepted the flotilla. Israeli Embassy confirms that Mandla Mandela and others would be deported on the 7 October 2025.

== Controversy ==
Members of the Mandela family approached the Mthatha High Court in July 2013 to force Mandela to return the remains of three of Nelson Mandela's children to Qunu. Mandela had moved them to Mvezo without consulting the Mandela family in 2011. The family also laid a criminal case of tampering with a grave. A South African High Court judge, Judge Lusindiso Phakade, ruled in favour of the complainants. He ordered Mandela to exhume and rebury the bodies at Qunu.

== See also ==
- Global March to Gaza
