= Graça Machel =

Mozambican politician and humanitarian (born 1945)

Graça Machel DBE HonFBA
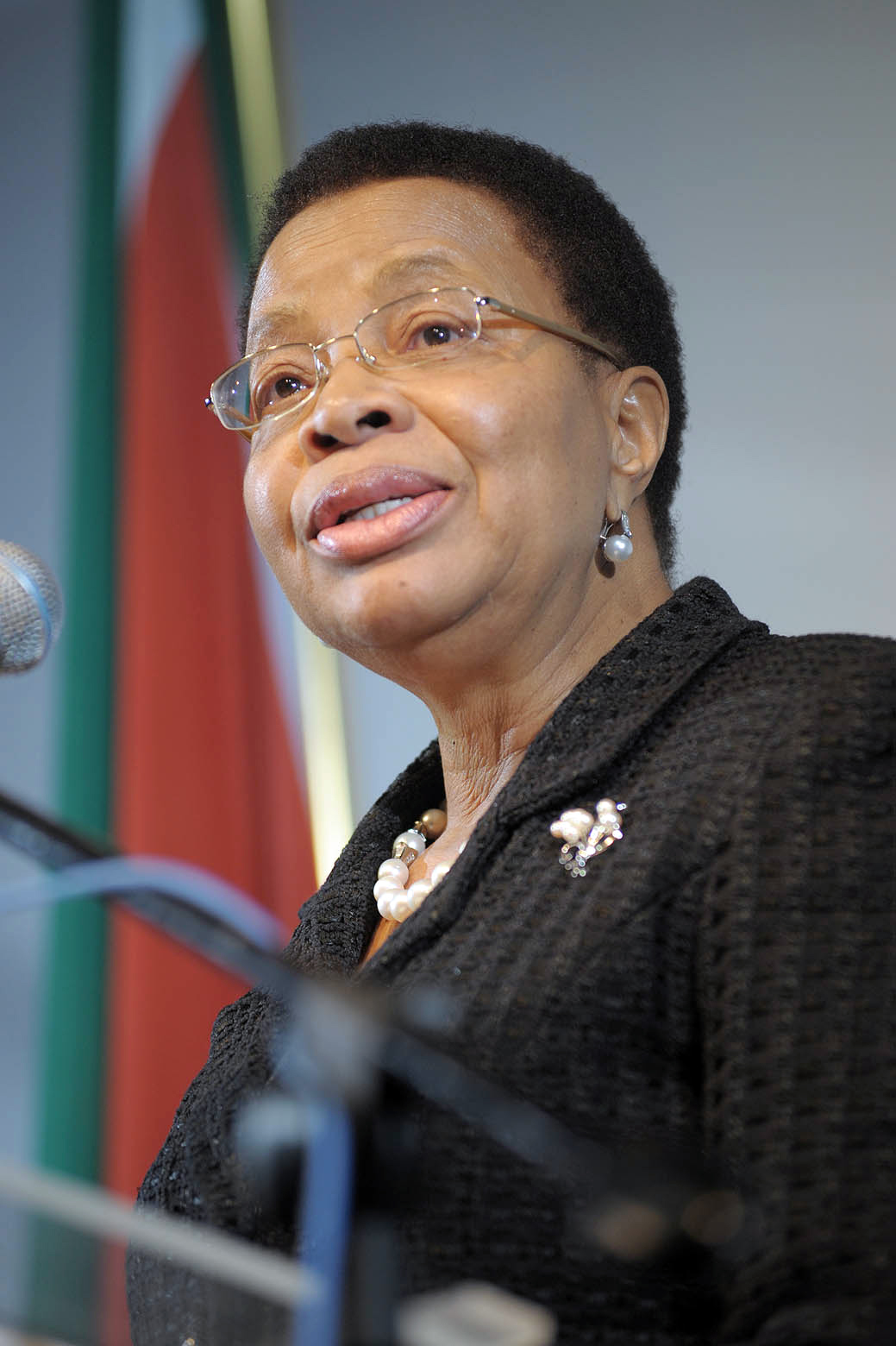
- Graça Machel in 2010

First Lady of South Africa
- In role 18 July 1998 – 14 June 1999
- President: Nelson Mandela (spouse)
- Preceded by: Zindzi Mandela; Zenani Mandela (step-daughter)
- Succeeded by: Zanele Mbeki

First Lady of Mozambique
- In role 11 November 1975 – 19 October 1986
- President: Samora Machel
- Preceded by: Position established
- Succeeded by: Marcelina Chissano
Mozambique offices 1975–1989
Minister of Education and Culture
In office 25 June 1975 – 1989
President	Samora Machel
Preceded by	Position established
Ceremonial offices 1999–2019
Chancellor of the University of Cape Town
In office 1999 – 31 January 2019
Vice-Chancellor	Njabulo Ndebele (2000–2008); Max Price (2008–2018)
Preceded by	Harry Oppenheimer
Succeeded by	Precious Moloi-Motsepe

Personal details
- Born: Graça Simbine; 17 October 1945 (age 81) Incadine, Portuguese Mozambique
- Party: FRELIMO (1973–present); African National Congress (1998–present)
- Spouses: Samora Machel (m. 1975; died 1986) Nelson Mandela (m. 1998; died 2013)
- Children: 2, including Josina
- Relatives: Mandela family (by marriage)
- Education: University of Lisbon
- Occupation: Teacher, politician, activist

Graça Machel DBE HonFBA (Portuguese pronunciation: [ˈɡɾasɐ mɐˈʃɛl]; née Simbine [sĩˈbinɨ]; born 17 October 1945) is a Mozambican politician and humanitarian. She is an international advocate for women's and children's rights and was made an honorary Dame Commander of the Order of the British Empire by Queen Elizabeth II in 1997 for her humanitarian work. Machel is also the only woman in modern history to have served as First Lady of two countries: South Africa and Mozambique. She is the widow of former President of Mozambique Samora Machel (to whom she was married from 1975 until he died in 1986) and former President of South Africa Nelson Mandela (to whom she was married from 1998 until he died in 2013).

She is a member of the Africa Progress Panel (APP), a group of ten distinguished individuals who advocate at the highest levels for equitable and sustainable development in Africa. As a panel member, she facilitates coalition building to leverage and broker knowledge, and convenes decision-makers to influence policy for lasting change in Africa. She was chancellor of the University of Cape Town between 1999 and 2019.

== Early life and education ==
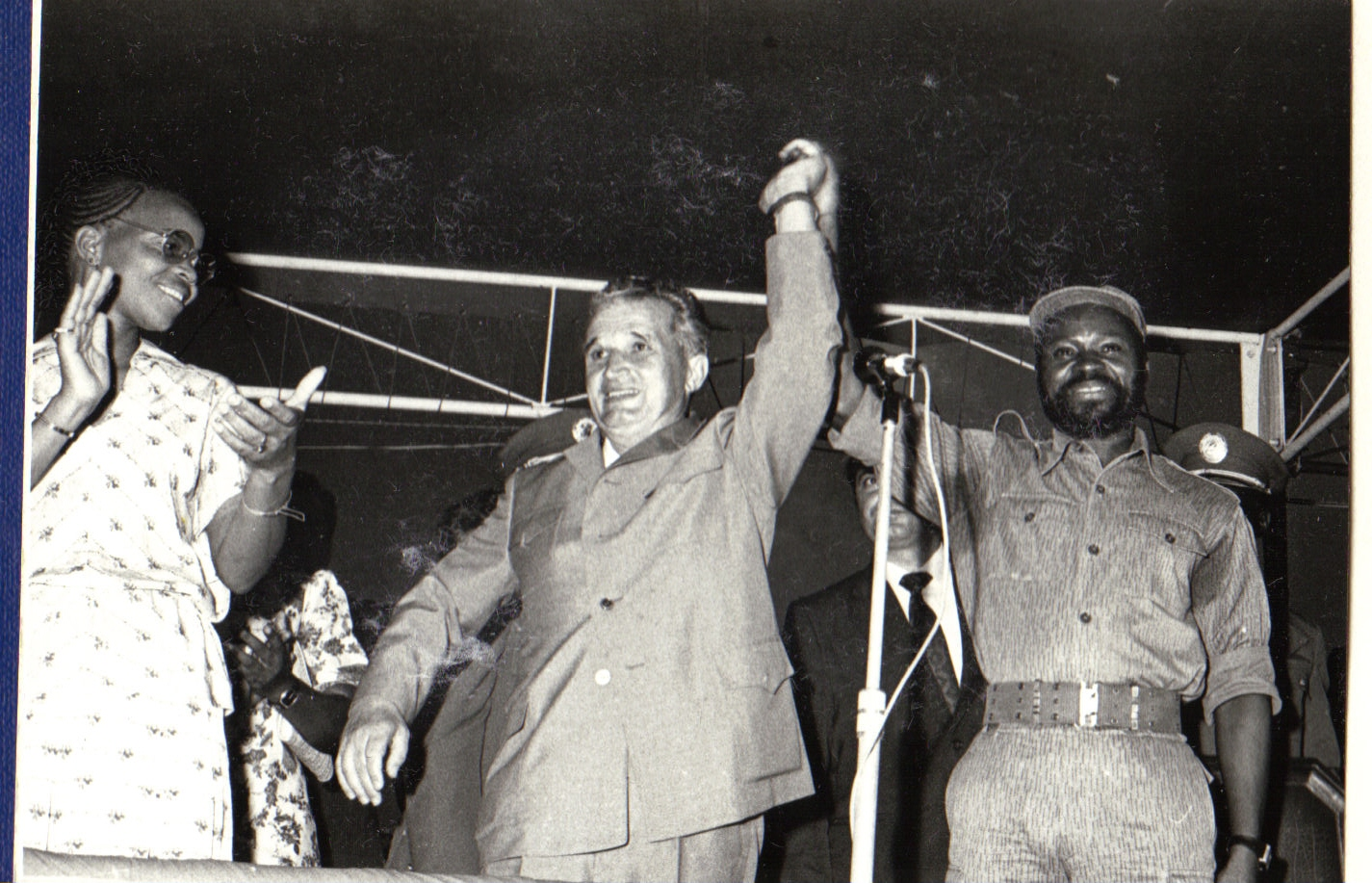
Graça and Samora Machel hosting Romanian Communist leader Nicolae Ceaușescu in Maputo, 1979

Graça Simbine was born 17 days after her father's death, the youngest of six children, in rural Incadine, Gaza Province, Portuguese East Africa (modern-day Mozambique). She attended Methodist mission schools before gaining a scholarship to the University of Lisbon in Portugal, where she studied German and first became involved in independence issues. Machel speaks Portuguese and English, as well as her native Xitsonga language.

== Political career ==
She returned to Portuguese East Africa in 1973, joining the Mozambican Liberation Front (FRELIMO) and working as a schoolteacher. Following Mozambique's independence in 1975, Simbine was appointed Mozambique's first Minister of Education and Culture on 25 June 1975. During her tenure, the number of students enrolled in primary and secondary schools rose from about 40 percent of all school-aged children to more than 90 percent for males and 75 percent for females.

== Later career ==
Graça Machel received the 1992 Africa Prize, awarded annually to an individual who has contributed to the goal of eliminating hunger in Africa by the year 2000. Machel received the 1995 Nansen Medal from the United Nations in recognition of her longstanding humanitarian work, particularly on behalf of refugee children.

In 1997, Machel was appointed an Honorary Dame Commander of the Order of the British Empire by Queen Elizabeth II for her contributions and services in the field of human rights protection. In the same year, she received the Global Citizen Award of the New England Circle. Machel was one of the two winners of the 1998 North–South Prize awarded by the North-South Centre of the Council of Europe.

Machel was chancellor of the University of Cape Town from 1999 to 2019. In 2009, Machel was appointed to the Commonwealth of Nations' Eminent Persons Group. She was named president of the School of Oriental and African Studies at the University of London in 2012.

In 2007, she and her husband joined Archbishop Emeritus Desmond Tutu as founders of The Elders, a charitable NGO.

In 2016, Machel was named chancellor of the African Leadership University, a role that she still holds today.

In July 2017, Machel was elected an Honorary Fellow of the British Academy (HonFBA), the United Kingdom's national academy for the humanities and social sciences. In 2018, she was awarded by the World Health Organization for her contributions to the health and well-being of women, children and adolescents.

On 17 July 2018, Machel attended the 16th Nelson Mandela Annual Lecture, which was located at the Wanderers Stadium, Johannesburg, alongside South African President Cyril Ramaphosa and former US President Barack Obama. The event was visited by nearly 15,000 people, commemorating the 100th anniversary of Nelson Mandela's birth.

In the lead‑up to COP 27, Machel advocates that Africa's youth should have a greater say in climate politics and warned that existing development aid programs covering, for example, education may well be cut and diverted to fund climate change adaptation instead.

=== United Nations ===
Following her retirement from the Mozambique ministry, Machel was appointed as the expert in charge of producing the groundbreaking 1996 United Nations report on the impact of armed conflict on children. From 2008 until 2009, she was a member of the High-Level Taskforce on Innovative International Financing for Health Systems, co-chaired by Gordon Brown and Robert Zoellick. In 2001, she published The Machel review, 1996-2000 : a critical analysis of progress made and obstacles encountered in increasing protection for war-affected children.

She served as the Chair of The Partnership for Maternal, Newborn & Child Health (PMNCH) from 2013-2018. In January 2016, she was also appointed by United Nations Secretary-General Ban Ki-moon to the High-level Advisory Group for Every Woman Every Child.

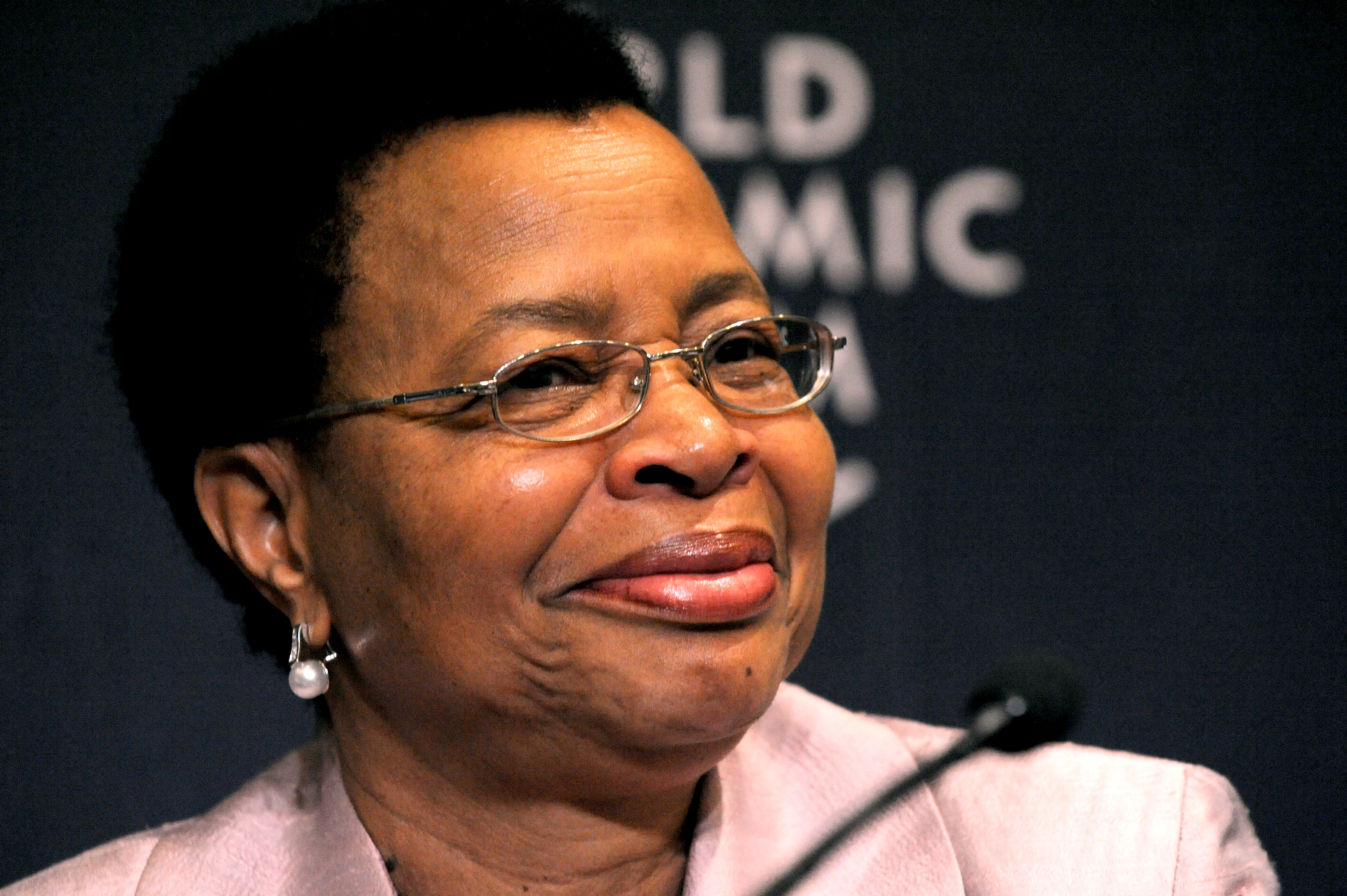
Machel during the WEF 2010

On 17 January 2016, she was appointed as a Sustainable Development Goals Advocate alongside 16 others, all appointed by Secretary-General of the United Nations.

=== The Elders ===
On 18 July 2007 in Johannesburg, South Africa, Nelson Mandela, Graça Machel, and Desmond Tutu convened The Elders. Mandela announced its formation in a speech on his 89th birthday. The group works on thematic as well as geographically specific subjects. The Elders' priority issue areas include the Israeli–Palestinian conflict, the Korean Peninsula, Sudan and South Sudan, sustainable development, and equality for girls and women.

Machel has been particularly involved in The Elders' work on child marriage, including the founding of Girls Not Brides: The Global Partnership to End Child Marriage.

=== Other activities ===
Corporate boards

- Whatana Investment Group, chairwoman of the board of directors
- PME African Infrastructure Opportunities, senior advisor (since 2014), independent non-executive member of the board of directors (2007–2014)
- Principle Capital Group, non-executive member of the board of directors (since 2004)

Non-profit organizations

- Africa Progress Panel (APP), member
- African Child Policy Forum (ACPF), chairwoman of the international board of trustees
- ACCORD, chairwoman of the board of trustees (since 2008)
- Association of European Parliamentarians with Africa (AWEPA), chair of the Eminent Advisory Board
- Mo Ibrahim Foundation, member of the board
- Nelson Mandela Children's Hospital, chairwoman of the board of trustees
- Synergos, member of the board of directors
- Foundation for Community Development (FDC), founder and president (since 1994)
- VillageReach, honorary chairwoman of the board of directors
- International Crisis Group (ICG), former member of the board of trustees
- United Nations Foundation, member of the board (1998–2007)
- Forum for African Women Educationalists (FAWE), co-founder and former member of the board (since 1992)

== Personal life ==
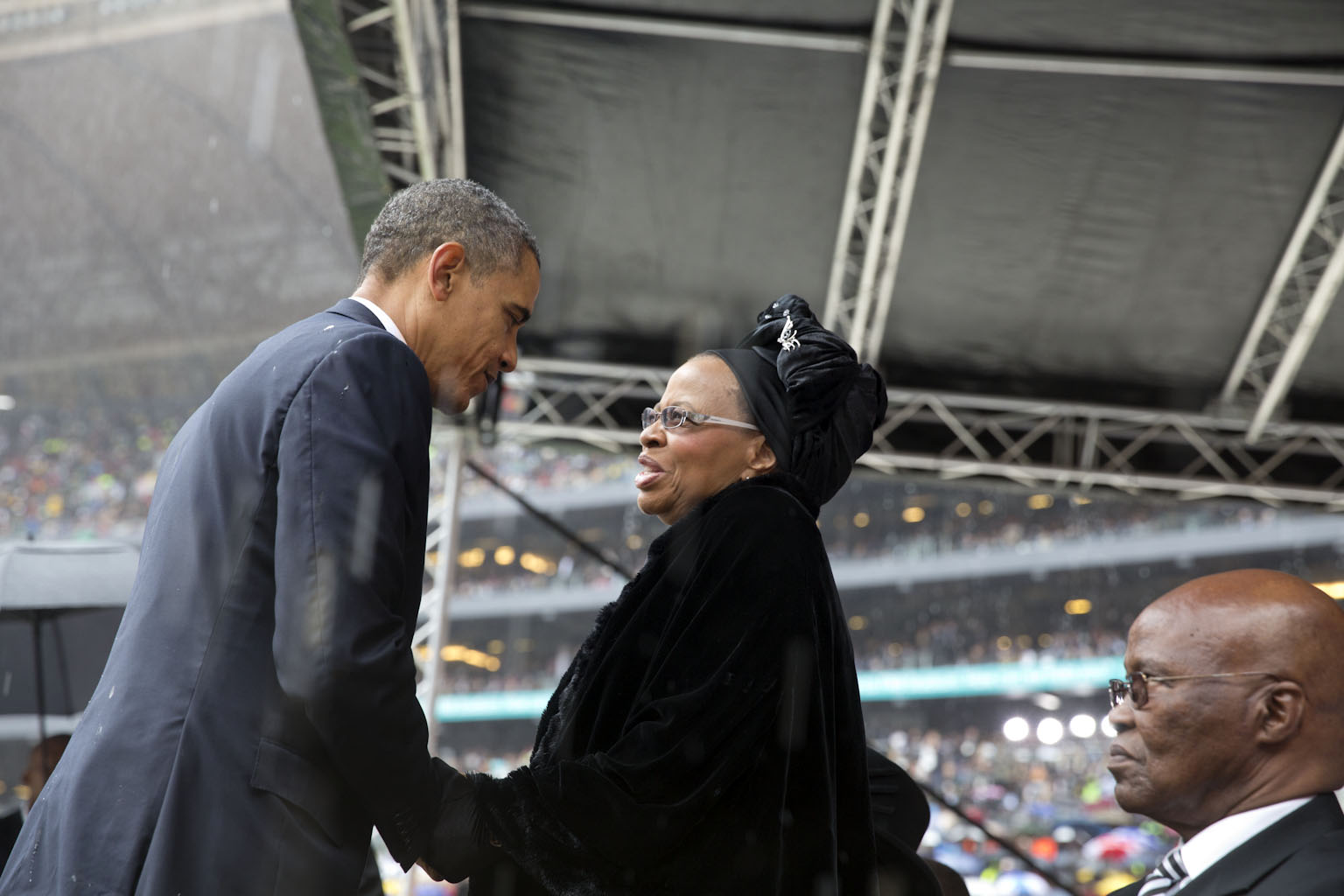
U.S. President Barack Obama greeting Machel at the memorial service for her late husband Nelson Mandela, Johannesburg, 2013.

Simbine married Samora Machel, the first president of Mozambique, in 1975. Together they had two children: daughter Josina (born April 1976) and son Malengane (born December 1978). Samora Machel died in office in 1986 when his presidential aircraft crashed near the Mozambique-South Africa border. Josina is a women's rights activist and in 2020 was listed as one of the BBC's 100 Women.

Graça Machel married her second husband, Nelson Mandela, in Johannesburg on 18 July 1998, Mandela's 80th birthday. At the time, Mandela was serving as the first post-apartheid president of South Africa. She became the only woman to have been First Lady of two countries. Mandela died of pneumonia on 5 December 2013.

== Honours, awards and international recognition ==
=== Honours ===
- Dame Grand Cross of the Order of Isabella the Catholic (GYC), 1997 (Spain)
- Honorary Dame Commander of the Order of the British Empire (DBE), 1997 (United Kingdom)
- Honorary Fellow of the British Academy (Hon FBA), 2017 (United Kingdom)

=== Awards ===
- Nansen Medal of the United Nations, 1995 (United Nations).
- Global Citizen Award of the New England Circle, 1997.
- InterAction's Humanitarian Award, 1997.
- North-South Prize of the Council of Europe, 1998 (Council of Europe).
- Princess of Asturias Award (International Cooperation), 1998 (Spain).
- World's Children's Prize (together with Nelson Mandela), 2005.
- Decade Child Rights Hero (together with Nelson Mandela) by 7.1 million children through a Global Vote, organized as part of the educational World's Children's Prize Program, 2010.
- World Health Organization Gold Medal, 2018 (WHO).
- Major award from CARE recognizing her longstanding work on behalf of children.
- Indira Gandhi Prize for Peace, Disarmament and Development, 2025

=== Honorary doctorates ===
- Honorary Doctor of Humane Letters (Hon. DHL) from the University of Massachusetts, 2006 (USA).
- Doctor of Philosophy honoris causa (DPhil h.c.) from the University of Stellenbosch, 2008 (South Africa).
- Doctor honoris causa (Dr. h.c.) by University of Barcelona, 2008 (Spain).
- Doctor honoris causa (Dr. h.c.) by University of Évora, 2008 (Portugal).
- Doctor in Laws honoris causa (LL.D. h.c.) by Trinity College Dublin, 2015 (Ireland).
- Doctor honoris causa (Dr. h.c.) by Leiden University, 2021 (Netherlands).

Honorary titles
New title	First Lady of Mozambique; 1975–1986	Succeeded by Marcelina Chissano
Vacant Title last held by Winnie Madikizela-Mandela	First Lady of South Africa; 1998–1999	Succeeded by Zanele Mbeki
