= Makgatho Mandela =

Son of Nelson Mandela (1950–2005)

- Born: Makgatho Lewanika Mandela; 26 June 1950; Union of South Africa
- Died: 6 January 2005 (aged 54); Johannesburg, South Africa
- Cause of death: AIDS
- Spouses: Rose Rayne Perry; Zondi
- Children: 4, including Mandla Mandela and Ndaba Mandela
- Parent(s): Nelson Mandela; Evelyn Mase
- Relatives: Thembekile Mandela (brother); Makaziwe Mandela (sister); Zenani Mandela-Dlamini (half-sister); Zindzi Mandela-Hlongwane (half-sister)

Makgatho Lewanika Mandela (26 June 1950 – 6 January 2005) was a South African businessman and the son of Nelson Mandela and Evelyn Mase. He died from an AIDS-related illness in Johannesburg in 2005. His death drew international attention after Nelson Mandela publicly disclosed its cause and called for greater openness in addressing HIV/AIDS.

== Biography ==
Makgatho Mandela was born on 26 June 1950, to Nelson Mandela and his first wife, Evelyn Mase. The third of their four children, he was named after politician Sefako Makgatho.

Makgatho is sometimes mistakenly identified as Nelson Mandela's eldest son. His elder sister, Makaziwe Mandela (1947–1948), died of meningitis at the age of nine months, while his elder brother, Madiba Thembekile ('Thembi') Mandela (1945–1969), was killed in a car accident at the age of 24. Makgatho's younger sister, was also named Makaziwe Mandela, by his parents, in honour of his deceased elder sister.

Following his father, Nelson's renunciation of his hereditary claim to the Thembu chieftaincy and Thembi's death, Makgatho became heir apparent to the position formerly held by his grandfather, Henry Mandela.

Makgatho was married twice, first to Rose Rayne Perry (later known as Nolusapho) and subsequently to Zondi. He had four sons: Zwelivelile "Mandla" Mandela (born 1974), Ndaba Mandela (born 1982), Mbuso Mandela (born 1991), and Andile Mandela (born 1993).

Zondi died on 13 July 2003 at the age of 46. Although her death was initially attributed to pneumonia, Mandla later stated that it resulted from an AIDS-related complication.

Makgatho died from an AIDS-related illness in Johannesburg on 6 January 2005, aged 54. Following his death, his hereditary claim passed to his son Mandla, who later succeeded as the tribal chief of the Mvezo Traditional Council.

After publicly disclosing the cause of his son's death, Nelson Mandela said: "Let us give publicity to HIV/AIDS and not hide it, because the only way to make it appear like a normal illness like tuberculosis, like cancer, is always to come out and say somebody has died because of HIV/AIDS, and people will stop regarding it as something extraordinary."
