= Zinhle Dlamini =

Swazi medical practitioner and businessman

HRH Zinhle Dlamini
- Born: 4 October 1980 (age 46)
- Issue: Zinokuhle (2014) Zenzelwe (2016)
- House: House of Dlamini; Mandela family
- Occupation: Medical practitioner Businessman

Prince Zinhle Dlamini of Eswatini, otherwise known as Zinhle Mandela-Dlamini (born 1980), is a Swazi medical practitioner and businessman. A member of the House of Dlamini and the Mandela family, he is both a grandson of the South African politicians Nelson and Winnie Mandela and a nephew of King Mswati III of eSwatini.

Prince Zinhle received the sum of ZAR 100,000 in his grandfather Dr. Mandela's final will and testament. He has also been active in charity, with him joining the American not-for-profit InspireHub to provide medical support to people in the Eastern Cape and other provinces of South Africa in 2014.
