= Prince Cedza Dlamini =

Swazi activist

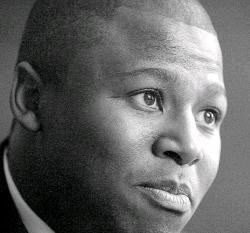
- Born: 24 February 1976 (age 50)
- Issue: Prince Cabumuzi Dlamini; Prince Thandolwethu; Prince Lethokuhle
- House: House of Dlamini
- Religion: Christian
- Occupation: Humanitarian

Prince Cedza Dlamini of Eswatini (formerly Swaziland), otherwise known as Prince Cedza (born 24 February 1976), grandson of King Sobhuza II of Swaziland and step-grandson of Nelson Mandela, is a humanitarian, youth activist, spokesman for the United Nations' Millennium Development Goals, and the founder of the Ubuntu Institute for Young Social Entrepreneurs. His work promotes future international cooperation by initiating and supporting global networks of young leaders through which they can work collectively to address such current world problems as HIV/AIDS, poverty, hunger and illiteracy. Prince Cedza also advocates stronger ties between the United States and South Africa, occupying a seat as a director on the board of the South African Chamber of Commerce in America.

== Family and background ==
Prince Cedza is the third son of eight children born to HRH Prince Thumbumuzi Dlamini of Swaziland, MBA, born 1950, a son of the late King Sobhuza II and an elder brother of the reigning king of Swaziland, Mswati III. His father married Zenani Mandela, born 1959, the eldest daughter of Nelson and his (second) former wife, Winnie Mandela. His father and step-mother are joint proprietors of a business, Mandela, Dlamini and Associates (MDA). His father's master's degree was earned at Boston University, and Prince Cedza also studied in Boston.

Prince Cedza is, by birthright and lineage, a royal prince of the dynasty which rules the kingdom of Swaziland, the House of Dlamini. The Dlaminis are Christian and, in Swaziland, practice traditional polygamy, so that the royal family has hundreds of members, many of whom are actively involved in government, civil service, diplomacy, or industry in Swaziland, but many of whom live outside of their native realm. Because of the size of the family, only the king inherits substantial wealth or receives a civil list; other family members usually work for a living.

Prince Cedza acknowledges when speaking publicly to student audiences that he went through a self-indulgent phase as a youth, before realizing that he was squandering his heritage and his future. He resolved to resume his education, and earned his bachelor's degree in International Relations from Tufts University in Boston in 2005.

== Education and employment ==
Prince Cedza began working as a young man with MDA, his family's international business consulting firm in Johannesburg. It was while at MDA that he has said he was exposed to the many obstacles faced by emerging black entrepreneurs in the post-apartheid South Africa. He resolved to educate himself in marketing and return one day to expand resources and provide economic opportunities for Southern Africans.

Prince Cedza next worked for the Mitsubishi Corporation in South Africa. For several years there he was an assistant to the Official Development Assistance Manager, facilitating development programs between Japan and all 14 countries in the Southern African Development Community region. His duties involved despatching mobile clinics to poor and rural areas, and assistance in developing Mitsubishi's African affirmative action policy.

Prince Cedza moved to the United States to study international relations in 2000.

== United Nations work ==
In October 2003, Prince Cedza was appointed Co-chair for the World Youth Peace Summit.

In June 2004, Prince Cedza was recruited by the United Nations Development Programme to participate in the first Pan African Youth Leadership Summit held in Dakar, Senegal focused on achieving Millennium Development Goals in Africa. Subsequently he was appointed as a spokesman for that campaign and has represented his continent in youth leadership conferences (e.g. UN's World Youth Peace) in Japan, Bosnia and Canada with other young leaders to seek peaceful resolutions to regional and global conflicts and to promote tolerance between cultures and faiths.

After September 11, 2001, Prince Cedza began a speaking tour throughout the U.S. that promotes global forgiveness, compassion, and the use of dialogue - instead of violence – as a powerful tool for conflict resolution. To date, Cedza has spoken to more than fifty non-profit organizations and academic institutions with audiences ranging from 200-14,000 people. He especially seeks to inspire young people, speaking on youth empowerment and leadership. Through his 3 Principles of Success, Prince Cedza encourages youths to realize that with the right attitude they can overcome difficult challenges.

== Social entrepreneurship ==
In 2005, Prince Cedza founded the Ubuntu Institute for Young Social Entrepreneurs, a youth-led non-profit organization focused on leadership enrichment, practical skills training and fundraising which recruits potential social entrepreneurs from all sectors of African society.

The Ubuntu Institute fosters implementation of the United Nations Millennium Development Goals through poverty alleviation programmes targeting unemployed youth from rural and semi-rural communities. Prince Cedza is committed to leading Ubuntu in the application of business principles to run a sustainable social enterprise. He has expressed concern that too often social entrepreneurs rely on donor funding and become less innovative. He maintains that South Africa has a plentiful supply of talent, opportunity and emerging entrepreneurs, but inadequate skills continue to be an obstacle in effectively tapping opportunities.

"Sustainability is key," says the prince. "A lot of people who start NGOs are looking for donor funding. A social entrepreneur knows he can't just depend on funding, he needs to be creative in all business aspects."

Among Ubuntu's projects is an international internship programme, through which successful candidates, mostly Africans, undertake internships in resorts in the United States, the United Kingdom, Australia and China for six to 12 months. Afterwards, Ubuntu assists the interns with employment placement in the hospitality industry. Dlamini says the programme has thus far helped more than 1000 young people who would have been unemployed.

Ubuntu generates over two-thirds of its funding from donors, but Prince Cedza aims for the organisation to eventually generate 60% of its funding from investments. Its investment arm, Ubuntu Institute Holdings, currently produces about a third of the institute's income. Dlamini would like donor funding to account for no more than 40% when the investment arm matures. With partners such as the Development Bank of Southern Africa and the Passenger Rail Agency of SA, Ubuntu is now developing programmes to meet the demand for rail engineering and related artisan skills.

== Awards/Recognition ==
In recognition of his work for social causes around the world, Prince Cedza has been honored in the United States with Keys to the City of Cambridge, Massachusetts and Little Rock, Arkansas.

== External sources ==
- https://web.archive.org/web/20160419234552/http://www.cedzadlamini.com/.
- Genealogy of the royal family of Swaziland
- University of Alberta Cover Story on Dlamini
- University of Alberta Article on Dlamini Keynote Address
- University of Alberta Article on Dlamini MDG Address
- Emmanuel College Photo Gallery of Dlamini
- University of St. Thomas Article on Dlamini
- Tufts University Profile on Dlamini
- New Hampshire Press Article on Dlamini Middle School Visit
- Article on Dlamini's Recognition by U.S. Students
- RESULTS Canada Profile on Dlamini
- World Youth Peace Summit profile on Dlamini
