= Mvezo =

- Location within Eastern Cape Location within South Africa
- Coordinates: 31.95°S 28.516°E
- Country: South Africa
- Province: Eastern Cape
- District: OR Tambo
- Municipality: King Sabata Dalindyebo

Government
  - Inkosi: Mandla Mandela MP

Area
  - Total: 2.13 km^{2} (0.82 sq mi)

Population (2011)
  - Total: 810
  - Density: 380/km^{2} (980/sq mi)

Racial makeup (2011)
  - Black African: 100.0%

First languages (2011)
  - Xhosa: 98.3%
  - Other: 1.7%
- Time zone: UTC+2 (SAST)

Mvezo is a small village on the banks of the Mbashe River, not far from Mthatha in the Eastern Cape of South Africa. The village is mainly known as being the birthplace of Nelson Mandela, a former president of South Africa, whose family serves as its chiefly dynasty. It is also the location of the Nelson Mandela Birthplace Museum.

== Transport ==
=== Airport ===
The nearest airports to Mvezo are Chief Dawid Stuurman International Airport, Mthatha Airport and King Phalo Airport.

=== Road ===
The nearest city to Mvezo is East London. The distance from East London to Mvezo is 198 kilometers.

== Notable Personalities ==
Nelson Mandela was born in this village on 18 July 1918.
