= Zindzi Mandela =

South African diplomat and poet (1960–2020)

Her Excellency Zindzi Mandela-Hlongwane
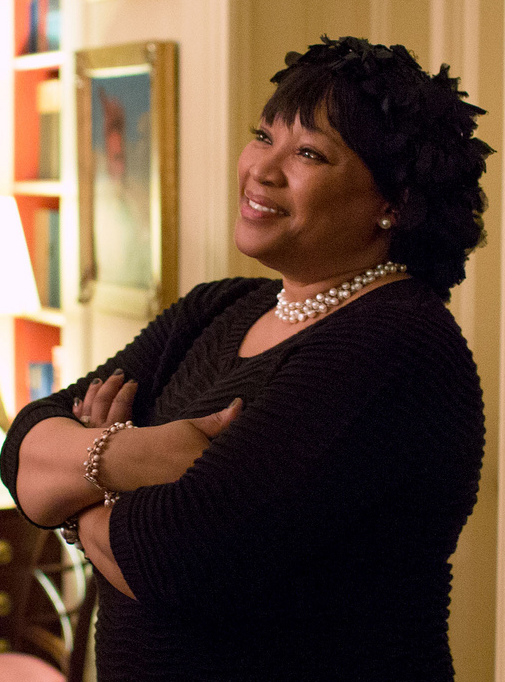
- Mandela in 2013

Ambassador to the Kingdom of Denmark from South Africa
- In office 2015 – 13 July 2020
- President: Jacob Zuma; Cyril Ramaphosa

Stand-in First Lady of South Africa
- In office 1996–1998 Serving with Zenani Mandela-Dlamini (sister)
- President: Nelson Mandela (father)
- Succeeded by: Graça Machel (step-mother)

Personal details
- Born: Zindziswa Nobutho Mandela; 23 December 1960 Soweto, Union of South Africa
- Died: 13 July 2020 (aged 59) Johannesburg, South Africa
- Resting place: Fourways Memorial Park Cemetery
- Spouses: Zwelibanzi Hlongwane (divorced); Molapo Motlhajwa (m. 2013)
- Children: 4, including Zoleka
- Parents: Nelson Mandela; Winnie Madikizela-Mandela
- Relatives: Zenani Mandela-Dlamini (sister); Thembekile Mandela (half-brother); Makgatho Mandela (half-brother); Makaziwe Mandela (half-sister)
- Education: University of Cape Town

Zindziswa "Zindzi" Mandela (23 December 1960 – 13 July 2020), also known as Zindzi Mandela-Hlongwane, was a South African diplomat and poet, and the daughter of anti-apartheid activists and politicians Nelson Mandela and Winnie Madikizela-Mandela. Zindzi was the youngest of Nelson Mandela's daughters, including sister Zenani Mandela.

She had served as her country's ambassador to Denmark, until her death in 2020, and was due to take up a post as ambassador to Liberia. She served as a stand-in First Lady of South Africa from 1996 to 1998.

Her collection of poems, Black As I Am, was published in 1978, with photographs by Peter Magubane.

== Early life ==
Zindzi Mandela was born on 23 December 1960 in Soweto, in what was then the Union of South Africa, to Nelson and Winnie Mandela. The year of her birth was also the year that the African National Congress (ANC) launched its armed wing. Her parents were wanted by the government. Zindzi was 18 months old when her father was sent to prison. During her youth she was often left in the care of her older sister Zenani Mandela when her mother was imprisoned for months at a time.

== Career ==
In 1977, when her mother was banished to the Orange Free State, Zindzi went to live with her there. Zindzi was not able to complete her education until she was sent to Swaziland. Eventually, her mother was allowed to move back to Soweto. Zindzi's father was offered a conditional release in 1985 by the then-State President, P. W. Botha. Her father's reply could not be delivered by either one of her parents. Consequently, Zindzi was chosen to read his refusal at a public meeting on 10 February 1985.

Her poetry was published in 1978 in the book Black as I Am, with photographs by Peter Magubane, and has also appeared in publications including Somehow We Survive: An Anthology of South African Writing, edited by Sterling Plumpp (1982), and Daughters of Africa: An International Anthology of Words and Writings by Women of African Descent, edited by Margaret Busby (1992). Zindzi studied law at the University of Cape Town, where she earned a BA in 1985.

In 1987, she participated in the CBS documentary, Children of Apartheid, by Walter Cronkite, who profiled young South Africans, including Mandela and P.W. Botha's daughter, Rozanne Botha. Die Burger, an Afrikaans pro-government newspaper, ran a front-page report, alleging the younger Botha had been "misused" in the documentary. In response, the South African Department of Foreign Affairs lodged a complaint with the US network. The newspaper claimed that the documentary-makers constructed a narrative to make it appear that Miss Botha and Miss Mandela "lived on separate planets."

She served as a stand-in First Lady of South Africa from 1996 until 1998, between her parents' divorce and her father's remarriage, to Graça Machel.

=== Ambassadorship ===
Zindzi was appointed South Africa's ambassador to Denmark in 2014. She first arrived in Denmark in June 2015. In June 2019, while Ambassador to Denmark, Mandela's Twitter account sent a series of increasingly strongly worded tweets, where she discussed "trembling white cowards who are the thieving rapist descendants of Van Riebeck [sic]", and "uninvited visitors who don't want to leave" that caused significant controversy. Mandela-Hlongwane had previously that month expressed her "deep, pure unconditional love and respect" for "CIC" (leader) of the Economic Freedom Fighters (EFF), Julius Malema.

While being investigated by the Department of International Relations and Cooperation (DIRCO) for breaching their social media policy, Mandela remained defiant, tweeting that "I am not accountable to any white man or woman for my personal views. No missus or baas here. Get over yourselves #OurLand". She was ordered by foreign minister Naledi Pandor to "conduct herself as a diplomat" and to adhere to the department's social media policy, and concern about her views was expressed by former president Thabo Mbeki, and her views were described as hate speech by ANC veteran Mavuso Msimang, while her opinions drew support from the EFF and the Premier of KwaZulu-Natal Sihle Zikalala. Her tweets came close to the end of her four-year term as ambassador to Denmark.

At the time of her death in Johannesburg, she was designated to take up a post as ambassador to Liberia, a posting described by family members as a "punishment" for her controversial tweets the previous year.

== Personal life and death ==
Zindzi was married twice and had four children - daughter Zoleka (1980–2023) with Oupa Seakamela and sons Zondwa (b. 1983) with Mbuyiselo Mboya, Bambatha (b. 1989) with Sizwe Clayton Sithole and Zwelabo (b. 1992) with her first husband, Zwelibanzi Hlongwane. She married her second husband, Molapo Motlhajwa, who was a member of the South African National Defence Force, in March 2013.

Mandela-Hlongwane was said to have agreed to arrange a boxing match between Floyd Mayweather and Manny Pacquiao to coincide with her father's birthday in 2011. The match did not take place and the boxing promoter Duane Moody sued successfully for a US court to order that she pay US$4.7m, plus costs, in damages to Moody. Mandela-Hlongwane was expected to appeal.

Zindzi died on 13 July 2020, aged 59, at a hospital in Johannesburg. It was revealed that she had tested positive for COVID-19 on the day of her death. She was buried next to her mother, Winnie Madikizela-Mandela, at Fourways Memorial Park on 17 July, a day before what would have been the 102nd birthday of her late father, Nelson Mandela.

== Portrayals ==
- In the 2009 BBC telefilm Mrs Mandela, Zindzi was portrayed by Refilwe Pitsoe.
- Bonnie Henna portrayed Zindzi in the film Invictus (2009).
- Xoliswa Sithole portrayed Zindzi in the TV film Mandela (1987).
