= Motsepe =

Motsepe is a common surname in Southern Africa. It is of Tswana origin.

== Geographical distribution ==
As of 2014, 97.8% of all known bearers of the surname Motsepe were residents of South Africa.

In South Africa, the frequency of the surname was higher than national average in the following provinces:

1. North West (1:1,655)
2. Gauteng (1:2,070)
3. Mpumalanga (1:4,026)

== People ==
- Augustine Butana Chaane Motsepe, South African businessman and the father of Bridgette, Patrice and Tshepo
- Bridgette Motsepe (born 1960), South African businesswoman and the sister of Patrice and Tshepo
- Patrice Motsepe (born 1962), South African mining magnate and the brother of Bridgette and Tshepo
- Patrick Motsepe (born 1983), Botswana footballer
- Tshepo Motsepe (born 1953), South African first lady and the sister of Patrice and Bridgette
