= Groote Schuur High School =

High School in South Africa

Location
- 77 Palmyra Rd; Newlands; Southern Suburbs; Cape Town, Western Cape, 7700; South Africa; 33.97465°S 18.47151°E

Information
- School type: Co-educational public school
- Established: 1959; 67 years ago
- Headmaster: Marius Ehrenreich
- Grades: 8–12
- Gender: co-educational
- Accreditation: National Senior Certificate
- Website: https://www.gshs.co.za/

Groote Schuur High School (formerly Hoërskool Groote Schuur) is a public English medium high school situated in Newlands – part of the Southern Suburbs region of Cape Town in the Western Cape province of South Africa. Founded in 1959 as an Afrikaans medium school in 1959, it was reserved for white pupils during the apartheid era. It became multiracial in the 1990s, when it became parallel-medium, with classes offered in both English and Afrikaans. English became the sole medium of instruction in 2011.

== Notable alumni ==
- Rozanne Botha, singer and daughter of P.W. Botha
- Anize du Plessis, singer
- Willemien Brümmer, journalist
- Nicola Hanekom, actress
- Jason Staggie, author and filmmaker
