= Nompumelelo Ntuli Zuma =

First Lady of South Africa

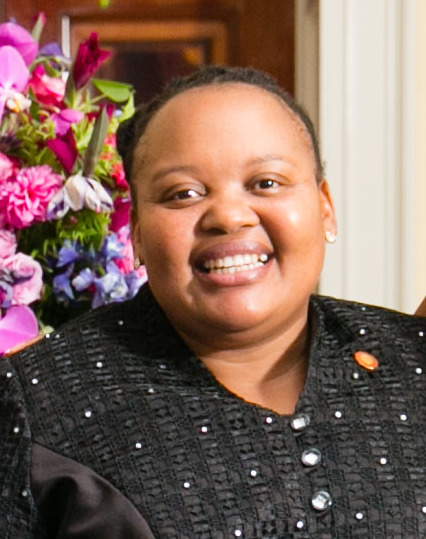
- Nompumelelo Zuma in 2014

First Lady of South Africa
- In role 9 May 2009 – 14 February 2018 Serving with Gertrude Sizakele Khumalo
- President: Jacob Zuma
- Preceded by: Mapula Motlanthe
- Succeeded by: Tshepo Motsepe

Personal details
- Born: Nompumelelo Ntuli
- Party: African National Congress
- Spouse: Jacob Zuma (m. 2008)
- Children: 3

Nompumelelo Ntuli Zuma (née Ntuli) is a former First Lady of South Africa. She is the second current wife in the polygamous marriage of Jacob Zuma, the former President of South Africa.

== Biography ==
The fourth woman that Jacob Zuma married and his second current wife, Nompumelelo Ntuli (MaNtuli) is the mother of three of his children, Manqoba Kholwani, Sinqobile and Thandisiwe. She married him in 2008 at a traditional ceremony which received plenty of media attention in the run-up to his bid for the presidency.

== Ban from compound ==
In 2015, it was alleged that Nompumelelo Zuma was part of a plot to poison her husband during his time in office. As a result, she was banned from the Nkandla homestead. She was detained by the State Security Agency, allegedly unlawfully, and was released later. Subsequent investigations found no evidence that either she or anyone else had sought to harm the President. The exact circumstances of her detention are under investigation.
