= First Lady of South Africa =

Spouse of the President of South Africa

First Lady of the Republic of South Africa
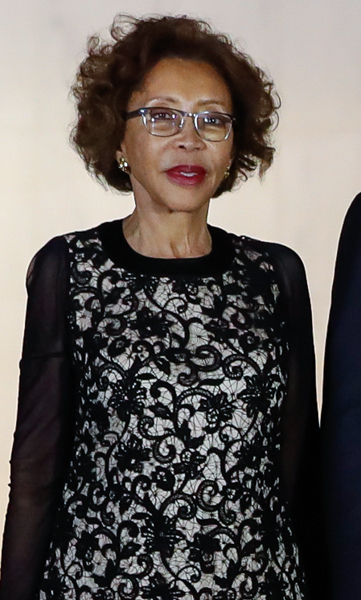
- Incumbent; Tshepo Motsepe since 15 February 2018
- Residence: Mahlamba Ndlopfu (Pretoria); Genadendal (Cape Town); Dr. John L. Dube House (Durban)
- Inaugural holder: Cornelia Swart
- Formation: 31 May 1961

First Lady of South Africa is the title held by the wife or most senior wife of the president of South Africa. The title can occasionally be used for the daughter or other female relative of the president.

== First ladies of South Africa ==
=== Apartheid era ===
| Portrait | First Lady | State President | In Office |
|---|---|---|---|
| | Cornelia Swart | Charles Robberts Swart | 1961–1967 |
| | Lettie Fouché | Jacobus Johannes Fouché | 1968–1975 |
| | Marga Potgeiter | Nico Diederichs | 1975–1978 |
| | Martini Vorster | B. J. Vorster | 1978–1979 |
| | Dorothea Viljoen | Marais Viljoen | 1979–1984 |
| | Elize Botha | Pieter Willem Botha | 1984–1989 |
| | Marike de Klerk | F. W. de Klerk | 1989–1994 |

=== Post-Apartheid era ===
| No. | Portrait | First Lady | President | In Office |
|---|---|---|---|---|
| 1 | | Zindzi Mandela-Hlongwane (daughter) | Nelson Mandela | 1994–1998 |
| 1 | | Zenani Mandela-Dlamini (daughter) | Nelson Mandela | 1994–1998 |
| 1 | | Graça Machel (married in 1998) | Nelson Mandela | (married in 1998)- 1999 |
| 2 | | Zanele Mbeki | Thabo Mbeki | 1999–2008 |
| 3 | | Mapula Motlanthe | Kgalema Motlanthe | 2008–2009 |
| 4 | | Sizakele Zuma | Jacob Zuma (Note: both Sizakele Zuma and Nompumelelo Ntuli Zuma have been referred to on the official Presidency of South Africa website as First Lady) | 2009–2018 |
| 4 | | Nompumelelo Ntuli Zuma | Jacob Zuma | 2009–2018 |
| 5 | | Tshepo Motsepe | Cyril Ramaphosa | 15 February 2018 – Present |

== See also ==
- President of South Africa
- State President of South Africa
- Annie Botha
- Isie Smuts
