= Mapula Motlanthe =

Former First Lady of South Africa

First Lady of South Africa
- Interim
- In role 25 September 2008 – 9 May 2009
- President: Kgalema Motlanthe
- Preceded by: Zanele Mbeki
- Succeeded by: Sizakele Zuma; Nompumelelo Ntuli Zuma

Personal details
- Born: Mapula Mokate
- Political party: African National Congress
- Spouse: Kgalema Motlanthe (m. 1975; div. 2014)
- Children: Kgomotso; Kagiso; Ntabiseng (step-daughter)

Mapula Motlanthe (née Mokate) is the former First Lady of South Africa and the ex-wife of former President of South Africa and Robben Island prisoner Kgalema Motlanthe.

== Biography ==
Mapula Mokate came from Sophiatown and spoke Tswana. Mapula started their relationship with Kgalema Motlanthe during the apartheid years and they married in 1975. Their children are Kagiso and Kgomotso. She worked as a radiographer in Leratong Hospital in Mogale City. Their first child was born in 1972.

After their marriage she lived with her husband's family and their second child, her husband was arrested and sent to Robben Island. Whilst he was in prison she gave birth to a daughter, Ntabiseng. Ntabiseng was not told that she had a different father until she was 21.

== Resignation of Thabo Mbeki and succession of husband ==
In 2008 then ANC president and President of South Africa, Thabo Mbeki resigned as the president of South Africa. Kgalema Motlante was chosen by the NEC to become the 4th democratic and 3rd post-Apartheid president of South Africa.

Motlanthe was sworn in as president at the Union Buildings in Pretoria, and Mapula became the first lady of the country.

== 2009 General Elections ==
In 2009 Kgalema Motlante was succeeded by former Deputy President of South Africa Jacob Zuma, as the new South African President, Kgalema was chosen to become the country deputy president.

== Divorce ==
Mapula and Kgalema started to divorce in 2011, and in 2014 they came to an amicable settlement. She received a monthly allowance and two houses. She and her husband had been separated for a number of years.
