= Gertrude Sizakele Khumalo =

First Lady of South Africa

Sizakele MaKhumalo Zuma

First Lady of South Africa
- In role 9 May 2009 – 14 February 2018 Serving with Nompumelelo Ntuli Zuma and 4 other wives
- President: Jacob Zuma
- Preceded by: Mapula Motlanthe
- Succeeded by: Tshepo Motsepe

Personal details
- Born: Gertrude Sizakele Khumalo; 2 March 1940 (age 86)
- Spouse: Jacob Zuma (m. 1973)

Gertrude Sizakele Khumalo (born 2 March 1940), also known as Sizakele MaKhumalo Zuma, was the First Lady of South Africa, and is the first wife in a polygamous marriage with Jacob Zuma, the former President of South Africa.

== Biography ==
Khumalo met Zuma in 1959 and the two started a relationship, but they were separated when Zuma was arrested in 1963 and sentenced to 10 years in prison. Zuma and Khumalo were married after he was released in 1973, and in 1975 Zuma went into exile leaving Khumalo behind. While in exile he started a relationship with another ANC exile Nkosazana Dlamini-Zuma and the two later got married, making Khumalo Zuma's first wife in a polygamous marriage according to Zulu tradition. The couple have no children.

By close sources to the Zuma family it has been alleged that Khumalo has been set to "mother" three of Zuma's children which he had out of wedlock according to a Zulu culture and tradition. The children are named as Nombuso, Nonhlanhla and an unnamed 39 year old male.

== First Lady of South Africa ==
Zuma became the 4th President of South Africa after the general election in 2009, and chose Khumalo to be his First Lady from 2009 to 2014, after which he chose one of his other wives, Nompumelelo Ntuli Zuma, to succeed her. She is the founder of the Sizakhele MaKhumalo Zuma Foundation.
