= Anna Elizabeth Botha =

First Lady of South Africa

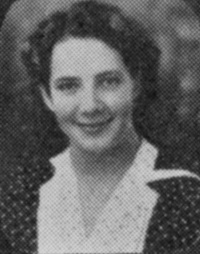
- Botha c. 1940

First Lady of South Africa
- In role 3 September 1984 – 15 August 1989
- Preceded by: Dorothea Viljoen
- Succeeded by: Marike de Klerk

Personal details
- Born: Anna Elizabeth Rossouw; 6 May 1922 Senekal, Orange Free State, South Africa
- Died: 6 June 1997 (aged 75) Wilderness, Western Cape, South Africa
- Party: National Party
- Spouse: P.W. Botha (m. 1943)
- Children: 5, including Rozanne Botha

Anna Elizabeth "Elize" Botha (née Rossouw; 6 May 1922 – 6 June 1997) was the First Lady of South Africa, as the wife of State President Pieter Willem Botha, from 1984 to 1989. From 1978 to 1984 Botha served as Prime Minister of South Africa.

Anna Elizabeth Rossouw married Botha on 13 March 1943. She went by the name Elize, and was the daughter of a pastor from Senekal, Dr S.H. Roussouw. They had two sons, Rossouw and Pieter Willem, and three daughters, Elanza, Amelia and Rozanne.

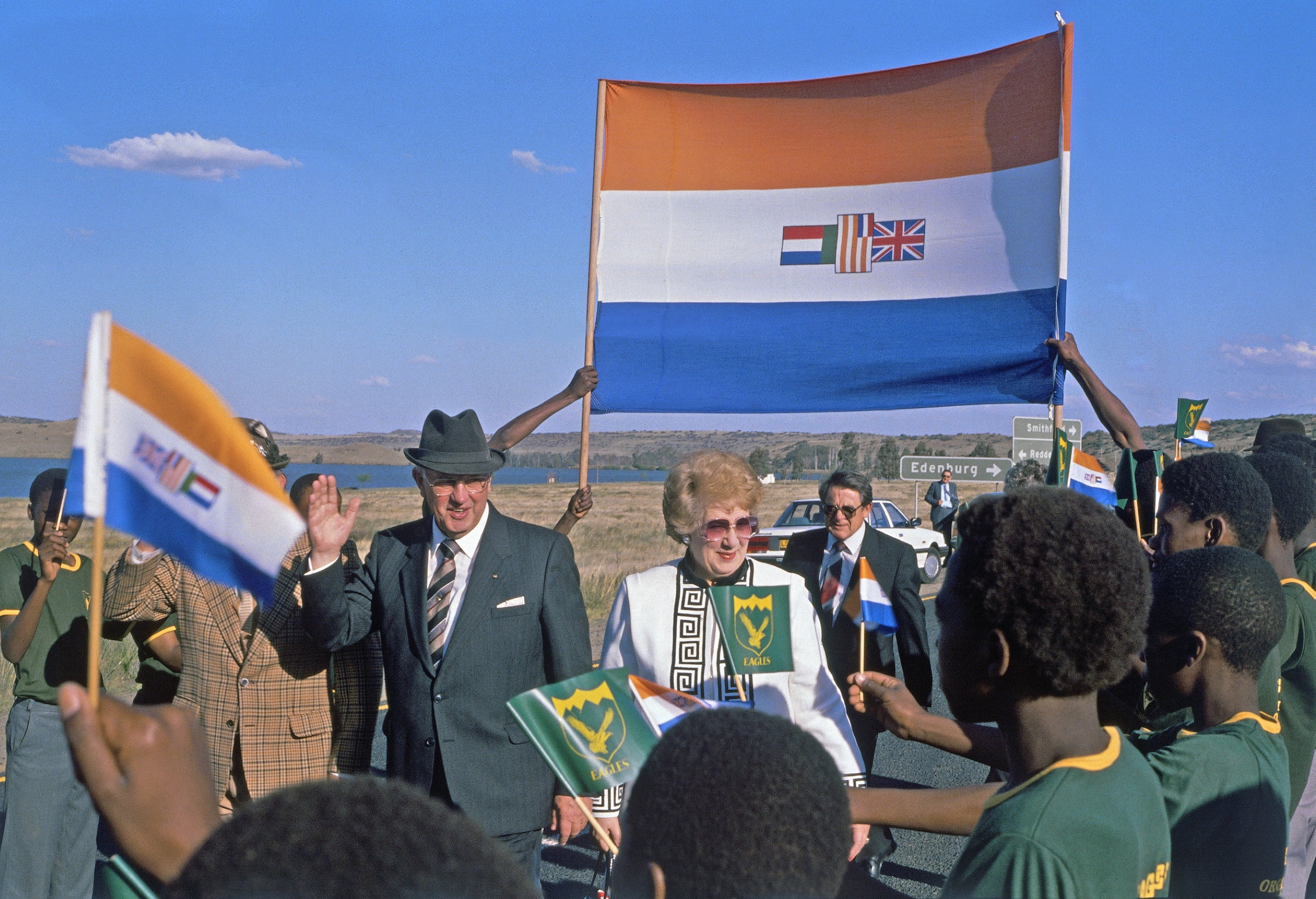
Botha and her husband greeting South African children in 1989

Elize Botha had stayed quietly in the background as the First Lady of South Africa. She earned admiration from Nelson Mandela for helping to arrange a luncheon that Mandela and widows of apartheid-era leaders attended.

She died on 6 June 1997 at the age of 75. She had suffered an aneurysm in 1978 but had been in good health since then.
