= Rozanne Botha =

South African singer-songwriter

- Botha on the cover of Style in February 1987
- Born: Rozanne Botha; October 14, 1959
- Died: 2 October 2022 (aged 62); Cape Town
- Education: Stellenbosch University
- Occupations: Singer, columnist
- Spouse: Schalk Visagie (1990–2022)
- Children: 2
- Parent(s): P.W. Botha; Anna Elizabeth Botha

Rozanne Visagie (née Botha; 14 October 1959 – 2 October 2022) was a South African singer-songwriter, columnist and daughter of State President, P.W. Botha. She emerged as a minor celebrity figure during her father's presidency, and was referred to as the "First Daughter" in the media.

== Early life and education ==
Botha was born in Pretoria in 1959 to parents, Anna Elizabeth Botha and P.W. Botha. She was one of five children.

She studied at Groote Schuur High School in Cape Town, where she was Head Girl. As a teenager, she was in a near-fatal car accident with her father, when a drunk driver crashed into their car head-on. She suffered a ruptured spleen and internal bleeding. She later said: “It was my Damascus road experience, when I realized life was fleeting and I needed to seize the day — carpe diem — and make the most of every moment.”

She completed voluntary military service at the South African Army Women's College in George in 1977, followed by the Castle of Good Hope in 1978. And she later attended Stellenbosch University, where she graduated with a BA in sociology and philosophy in 1981. Among her professors was Willie Esterhuyse, who acted as an informal political advisor to her father.

== Biography ==
In the 1980s, Rozanne, emerged as a minor celebrity figure in the country. She released Afrikaans pop songs and appeared on the covers of magazines such as Sarie and Style, where she was dubbed "First Daughter of the Land". During this time, she became the public face of the Botha children and wrote a weekly column for the Afrikaans newspaper, Beeld. In the late 1980s, her columns were published as a book.

In December 1987, CBS aired a documentary by Walter Cronkite that profiled Botha as the First Daughter of South Africa, as well as Zindzi Mandela, the daughter of Nelson Mandela. Die Burger, a pro-government Afrikaans newspaper, ran a front-page report that Botha had been "misused" in the documentary. In response, the South African Department of Foreign Affairs lodged a complaint with the US network. The newspaper claimed that the documentary-makers constructed a narrative to make it appear that Miss Botha and Miss Mandela "lived on separate planets." In a May 1988 speech to parliament, P.W. Botha harshly criticised "media terrorists", but said that no action would be taken against CBS. The government had alleged that as Cronkite was in South Africa on a visitor's visa, that he had violated media regulations by working on the documentary without being issued a work permit. The president decided not to take action after receiving a response from CBS network news president, Howard Stringer. The documentary won an Emmy Award for Outstanding Achievement in a Documentary and the Edward R. Murrow Award (Overseas Press Club of America).

As a singer, she performed for South African Defence Force soldiers during the South African Border War. She released her first album in 1989. A single from the album, "Kan 'n Man Dan Nie" became popular and has since been covered by other Afrikaans artists. She later faced challenges in the music industry as she could not find a music distributor interested in her music. She subsequently released four more albums independently and self-funded the projects. A rendition of the song "Siembaba" (lullaby) by Johannes Kerkorrel and Koos Kombuis ends with a satirical allusion to Botha and her apolitical poetry.

In the 1980s she also worked for Mimosa Films as a production coordinator for the next years, creating documentary films. She worked with the founder and producer Boet Troskie, who produced The Gods Must Be Crazy.

According to Nelson Mandela's former private secretary, Zelda La Grange, Mandela was fond of Botha's husband, Schalk Visagie, a top police officer, as he was progressive-minded and had influence over his more conservative wife, Rozanne. At her employer's request, La Grange arranged a dinner between the president, Rozanne, Schalk and Rozanne's sister Elsa, and her husband on 8 February 1998. Mandela had hoped to lobby the family so that they would persuade Botha to testify at the new government's Truth and Reconciliation Commission (TRC), set up to expose apartheid-era crimes and chaired by Archbishop Desmond Tutu. There was no unanimous agreement between the family, with Rozanne strongly opposed, believing that her father could face prosecution and/or humiliation in the court.

In 1999, Botha's husband, Schalk Visagie, who was in charge of the PAGAD unit of the police, was shot. He suffered three bullet wounds, and the couple were visited in hospital by Nelson Mandela. At the hospital, she rebuked Mandela for the current levels of crime in South Africa. The incident was widely reported in the press, and drew criticism from La Grange.

In 2012-2013, she used music as part of her campaign “I will be your voice”, to raise money for local wildlife centres targeting rhinoceros poaching. As part of the campaign, she sang a duet with her daughter, Shanna, accompanied by her son Schalk on piano and guitar and with the group Heavenly Quartez from Khayelitsha singing in Xhosa, in the chorus.

== Personal life ==
In 1990, Botha married Schalk Visagie, after they got engaged on Table Mountain. The couple had two children together, Schalk Jr. and Shanna.

In early 2022, Botha's sister, Amelia Paschke, died in a car crash driving back from Betty's Bay.

Botha was deeply religious, and devoted much of her time and efforts to Evangelical Christianity, causes and outreach.

== Death ==
Botha died of cancer on 2 October 2022 at a private hospital in Cape Town. She had survived two previous bouts of cancer in 2016 and 2009-2010. A memorial service was held for Botha on 8 October 2022 at Church on the Rise, an Evangelical church in Blouberg, Western Cape.
