= Jason Staggie =

South African filmmaker and writer

- Born: Cape Town, South Africa
- Citizenship: South Africa
- Education: Groote Schuur High School
- Alma mater: University of Cape Town (Psychology) Prague Film School (Directing and Screenwriting)
- Occupations: Writer; filmmaker
- Writing career
- Language: English
- Genre: Transgressive fiction Literary Fiction
- Notable work: Risk
- Website: www.jasonstaggie.com

Jason Staggie is a South African filmmaker and writer of transgressive fiction and literary fiction. His style has been compared with Anthony Burgess, Chuck Palahniuk and Irvine Welsh.

Staggie is best known for his controversial, acclaimed 2013 debut novel Risk. Risk was nominated for a South African Literary Award in the Best Young Author category, and revolves around a group of hedonistic university students who create the ultimate dare game, which culminates in them attempting to trigger a modern-day revolution. It has been likened to an African Fight Club and Less than Zero Staggie's background has been influenced by his being a nephew of Rashied of the Hard Livings gang, though this was not a direct influence on Risk. His filmmaking was influenced primarily by Quentin Tarantino, and his skills led to his being selected as a finalist in the 2013 Kevin Spacey Jameson Prize.

Staggie is a fellow of Film Independent's Global Media Makers residency in Los Angeles, as well the Realness Institute's Netflix Episodic Lab for his original TV series, RISK.

He completed his forthcoming novel, Fugue State, when he was awarded the artist-in-residence position at the Bridgeguard arts residency in Slovakia.

== Early life ==
Staggie grew up in Cape Town, South Africa. His mother Cheryl removed him from criminal surroundings, for which he dedicated to her his book Risk.

== Since university ==
Staggie graduated UCT with a degree in psychology in 2005, then moved to Ireland to raise funds for charities. After Ireland he taught ESL in South Korea before moving to Prague, Czech Republic, where he studied directing and screenwriting at Prague Film School. He is now living back in Cape Town, where he studied for his honours at UNISA, and made a documentary about the Hard Livings gang.

In 2013, Staggie's Fluxus video poem "Requiem for Lithium" was selected for the Visible Verse Festival in Vancouver.

In 2014, Staggie's short story "Beaufort West" was published in the Sunday Times Lifestyle magazine's “FFWD >> 2034 The Future Fiction Edition”. The special edition was published to celebrate 20 years of democracy in South Africa and featured short stories by 40 top South Africa authors set in South Africa on 27 April 2034 – 20 years after the publication date.

== Films ==
In 2021, Staggie's debut documentary feature film, Hard Livings premiered at the Durban International Film Festival. The film was well received at the festival and was a finalist for the Audience Award. The film also screened, amongst others, at the One People International Film Festival in Cape Town, The African Diaspora International Film Festival in New York City, as well as the Tagore International Film Festival, where it won the Critics Choice Award.
