= Zanele Dlamini Mbeki =

South African social worker and feminist (born 1938)

First Lady of South Africa
- In role 14 June 1999 – 24 September 2008
- President: Thabo Mbeki
- Preceded by: Graça Machel
- Succeeded by: Mapula Motlanthe

First Lady of African Union
- In office 9 July 2002 – 10 July 2003
- President: Thabo Mbeki
- Preceded by: position established
- Succeeded by: Marcelina Rafael Chissano

Personal details
- Born: Zanele Dlamini; 18 November 1938 (age 87) Alexandra, Gauteng, South Africa
- Spouse: Thabo Mbeki (m. 1974)
- Children: Dlammini
- Education: University of the Witwatersrand; London School of Economics; Brandeis University
- Profession: Social worker

Zanele Mbeki OMSS (née Dlamini; born 18 November 1938) is a feminist South African social worker who founded the Women's Development Bank. She is also a former first lady of South Africa.

== Early life and education ==
Zanele Dlamini was born in 1938 in Alexandra, South Africa, where her father was a Methodist priest and her mother a dressmaker. She has five sisters.

Zanele was a boarder at the Catholic Inkamana Academy in KwaZulu-Natal, before studying to be a social worker at the University of the Witwatersrand.

After working for three years for Anglo American plc as a case worker in Zambia, she moved to London, England, and completed a diploma in social policy and administration at the London School of Economics in 1968. She later won a scholarship to do her PhD on the position of African women under apartheid at Brandeis University in the United States, although before completing it, she left the United States to marry Thabo Mbeki.

== Career ==
While in London, Mbeki worked as a psychiatric social worker at Guy's Hospital, and at the Marlborough Day Hospital.

After her marriage, she worked for the International University Education Fund in Lusaka, Zambia. She resigned in 1980, shortly before it was closed down after the exposure of her boss, Craig Williamson, as a South African spy. She was also elected to the Women's League of the African National Congress (ANC) and edited its publication Voice of Women. She lectured at the University of Zambia for two years and then worked for the United Nations High Commissioner for Refugees in Nairobi, Kenya.

After returning to South Africa in 1990, Mbeki founded the Women's Development Bank, which offers microfinance to poor South African women. While her husband was campaigning, she rarely appeared with him and refused to grant interviews. When her husband became President in 1999, she became First Lady of South Africa. She is a feminist and an advocate for women's rights. In July 2003, she convened the South African Women in Dialogue, designed to enable women to participate fully in the country's development.

== Personal life ==
Mbeki met Thabo Mbeki while studying at the University of London and they were married in a registry office in London on 23 November 1974, followed by a religious ceremony at the home of her older sister Edith, Farnham Castle in Surrey. He had to receive permission from the ANC to marry and reportedly told Adelaide Tambo: "[I]f Papa [Oliver Tambo] doesn't allow me to marry Zanele, I'll never, ever marry again. And I'll never ask again. I love only one person and there is only one person I want to make my life with, and that is Zanele." The couple have no children and have often lived apart.
