= Bridgette Radebe =

South African businesswoman (born 1960)

- Born: Bridgette Motsepe; 26 February 1960 (age 65); South Africa
- Occupation: Businesswoman
- Known for: Being one of Africa's first black female mine owner/operators
- Spouse: Jeff Radebe
- Relatives: Patrice Motsepe (brother); Tshepo Motsepe (sister); Cyril Ramaphosa (brother in-law); Precious Moloi-Motsepe (sister-in-law); Augustine Butana Chaane Motsepe (father)

Bridgette Radebe (née Motsepe) is a South African businesswoman of Tswana descent and the sister of South African businessman Patrice Motsepe and First Lady of South Africa Tshepo Motsepe.

== Career ==
She was born on 26 February 1960. Radebe started out as a common miner in the 1980s; managing individual shaft mining operations and producing materials for the larger mine operations in South Africa while working under a contract. She started Mmakau Mining; a mining firm which initiates explorations and helps to produce platinum, gold, and chrome.

Radebe is the President of the South African Mining Development Association and her husband was South Africa's Minister in the Presidency Jeff Radebe. She is also the member of the New Africa Mining Fund and serves on the Sappi Board. Bridgette has criticized the "capitalist mining model" because "it takes land to exploit the materials, the exports create ghost towns, and jobs go overseas." Following South Africa's transition to democracy in 1994, approximately 83% of the country's natural resources remained under the ownership of the white minority. Today, 91% of the same resources are owned by corporate monopolies. She suggests three solutions to solve the problem: 1) complete nationalization of all mining operations, 2) a state buyout of the mining operations of dwindling profitability in the name of black empowerment, 3) a co-operation movement between public and private sectors over the running of South Africa's mines.

Radebe received an "International Businessperson of the Year Award" in May 2008 by the Global Foundation for Democracy. This award recognizes businesspeople who have made a difference in the world of changing political and environmental landscapes.

On 1–2 July 2011, Radebe played an assisting role in the wedding ceremony of Prince Albert II of Monaco and the former Charlene Wittstock.

In 2019, Radebe was appointed as member of the BRICS Business Council.
