= Marike de Klerk =

First Lady of South Africa (1937–2001)

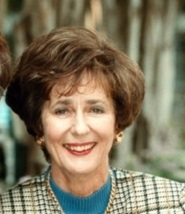

First Lady of South Africa
- In role 15 August 1989 – 10 May 1994
- President: F. W. de Klerk
- Preceded by: Anna Elizabeth Botha
- Succeeded by: Winnie Madikizela-Mandela

Personal details
- Born: Marike Willemse; 29 March 1937 Pretoria, Transvaal, Union of South Africa
- Died: 3 December 2001 (aged 64) Cape Town, Western Cape, Republic of South Africa
- Cause of death: Murder
- Party: National
- Spouse: F. W. de Klerk (m. 1959; div. 1996)
- Children: 3
- Education: Potchefstroom University

Marike de Klerk (née Willemse; 29 March 1937 – 3 December 2001) was the First Lady of South Africa, as the wife of State President Frederik Willem de Klerk, from 1989–1994. She was also a politician of the former governing National Party in her own right. De Klerk was murdered in her Cape Town home in 2001.

== Biography ==
=== Personal life ===
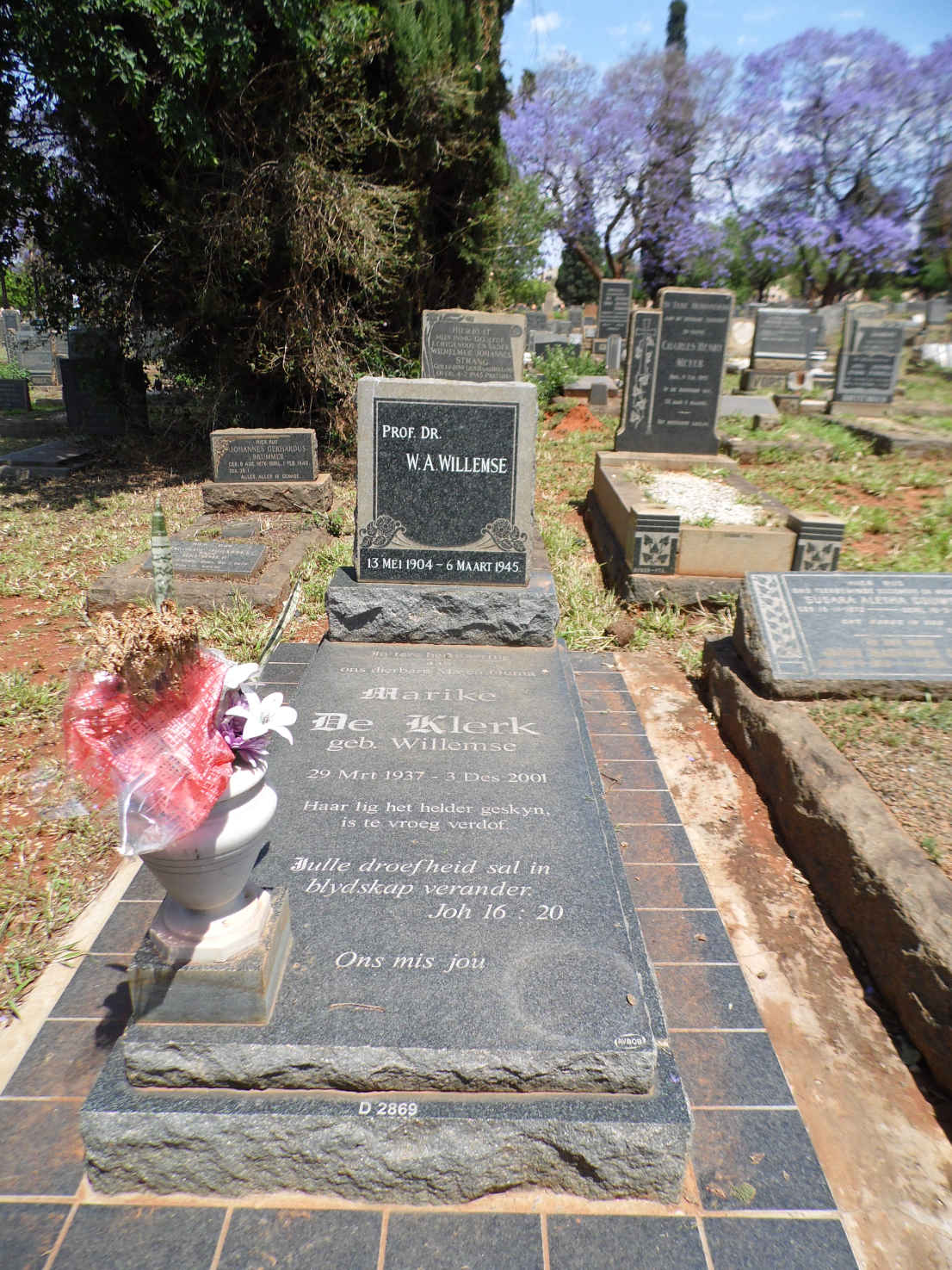
The graves of Prof W.A. Willemse and his daughter Marike de Klerk in the Pretoria West Cemetery

Marike Willemse was born into an upper-middle class Afrikaner family in Pretoria. Her father, Wilhelm Willemse, was an academic and writer. He was a professor of Social Pathology and Psychology at University of Pretoria.

Willemse met her future husband, F. W. de Klerk, at Potchefstroom University (where she was studying for a degree in commerce). The couple later married and adopted three children together; Jan, Willem, and Susan.

In 1983, de Klerk made comments about the Coloured community: "You know, they are a negative group ... a non-person. They are the people that were left after the nations were sorted out. They are the rest."

In 1991, she became embroiled in a personal drama when the South African press revealed that her son, Willem was in an 18-month-long relationship with a coloured woman, Erica Adams. Adams was also from a political background, her father being a politician for the Labour Party. Willem's romance with Erica upsets Marike was the headline published by the Sunday Times. Marike pressured Willem to end the inter-racial romance, the couple ended their engagement in 1992 and Willem married another woman the following year.

De Klerk was later unhappy with housing arrangements during South Africa's transition to democracy. It was originally intended that after the election in 1994, she and the president would stay in the Libertas home and Nelson Mandela would take up residence in another home known as the Presidency. Mandela later said that he was under pressure from his political party, the ANC to take up residence at Libertas. Therefore, the de Klerks would instead move to the Presidency. Mandela then told the de Klerks that senior colleagues wanted to use the Presidency for other uses. Therefore, they moved into Overvaal, the former home of Transvaal's administrators. Overvaal needed substantial refurbishing and de Klerk was angry that Mandela carried out a personal inspection to decide what the home needed, costs that the public works department would meet.

FW de Klerk later said: "She was deeply distressed by all the chopping and changing which she interpreted as a calculated attempt by Mandela himself to humiliate us... This latest humiliation became too much for her to swallow. She became very critical of Mandela and did not hesitate to voice her criticism." The de Klerks later attended Mandela's inauguration as president at the Union Buildings in Pretoria. Melanie Verwoerd would later recount that de Klerk was the only person sitting in the packed public gallery as Mandela entered the room and those around her rose and clapped. One MP implored the former first lady to acknowledge the occasion: "Get up Marike, you are rude!", but de Klerk remained seated and glared at the MP.

In 1994, FW de Klerk began an affair with Elita Georgiades, the wife of Tony Georgiades, a Greek shipping tycoon who had allegedly given de Klerk and the National Party financial support. FW and Marike's marriage ended in 1996 with FW announcing on Valentine's Day that he intended to divorce his wife of 37 years. Marike was opposed to the divorce: "If you change your mind, I'll forgive everything – up to 70 times seven." However, FW replied: "I'm certain about my decision. Stop hoping." F. W. de Klerk married Georgiades a week after his divorce to Marike was official.

In 2000, she faced further emotional upheaval when her relationship with her fiancé and businessman Johan Koekemoer, collapsed. When the media revealed that he was facing impending bankruptcy, de Klerk defended her fiancé, but soon after he faced a nervous breakdown and checked into a Pretoria clinic. In the later years of her life, she battled depression.

=== Career ===
During her husband's presidency, Marike was the leader of the National Party's women's wing. She also founded the Women's Outreach Foundation (WOF), an organisation that focused on the upliftment of rural women. In 1990 de Klerk called for women to play a more active role in the political process. In 1993, she was awarded the Woman for Peace Award in Geneva, Switzerland for promoting the well being and development of rural women.

In 1994, de Klerk and her entourage travelled to the United States for a tour of new educational projects in Los Angeles designed to interest African Americans in science.

The WOF was frequently in the news in the 1990s for criticising corruption among ANC leaders. The war of words between the ruling party and the former first lady escalated when the party dismissed her as "a bitter person unable to come to terms with the fact that she is an ex-first lady of this country."

In 1998, de Klerk published her autobiography, A Journey Through Summer and Winter, in which she explored her marriage of 39 years with FW de Klerk. The book later earned some notoriety after it emerged that FW had censored a chapter that deals with her heartbreak after discovering her husband's affair with Elita Georgiades. Later de Klerk published A Place Where the Sun Shines Again where she offered guidance to women facing divorce later in life.

== Murder ==
On 3 December 2001, de Klerk was murdered at her Dolphin Beach flat in Blouberg, Cape Town. It was originally reported that the former first lady had taken her own life.

Her killer, 21-year-old Luyanda Mboniswa, worked as a security guard in the luxury secure complex where de Klerk was living. Mboniswa violently gripped de Klerk's neck, breaking several bones in her throat and causing a blood vessel to burst in her eye. A steak knife was found embedded in her back and she also suffered several wounds to the head. Mboniswa was acquitted of a rape charge but a pathologist was not able to rule out penetration.

Her ex-husband had, at the time of the discovery of her body, been in Stockholm for a celebration on the centennial of the Nobel Peace Prize, and quickly returned to South Africa to issue a statement saying "I have learned with great shock and sorrow (skok en hartseer) of the circumstances of the tragic death of my former wife Marike." Winnie Madikizela-Mandela made a speech at the former First Lady's funeral in Pretoria, saying; "As a woman, I identify with the exhaustion of her emotional resources in helping to shape her husband's career." Winnie Mandela chose to attend de Klerk's funeral rather than the funeral of ANC stalwart Joe Modise.

De Klerk bequeathed her R2 million estate and properties to her children.

Luyanda Mboniswa was convicted of de Klerk's murder and sentenced to life imprisonment. He was paroled and released from prison after serving 22 years.
