= Jeff Radebe =

South African politician (born 1953)

Jeffrey Thamsanqa Radebe
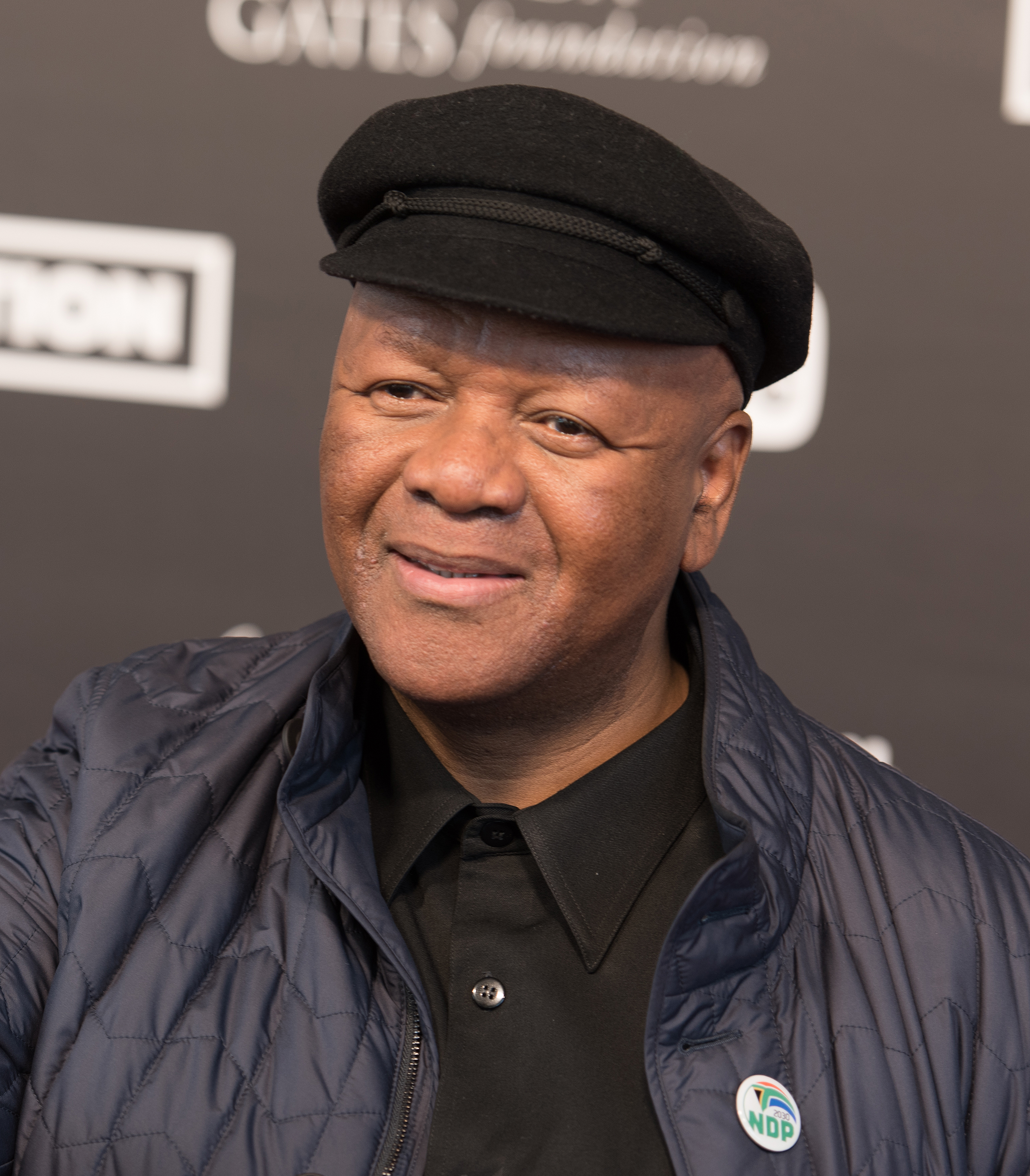
- Radebe in 2017

Minister of Energy
- In office 26 February 2018 – 30 May 2019
- Preceded by: David Mahlobo
- Succeeded by: Gwede Mantashe

Minister in the Presidency
- In office May 2014 – February 2018

Minister of Justice and Constitutional Development
- In office 11 May 2009 – 25 May 2014
- Preceded by: Enver Surty
- Succeeded by: Michael Masutha

Minister of Transport
- In office 29 April 2004 – 10 May 2009
- President: Thabo Mbeki; Kgalema Motlanthe
- Preceded by: Dullah Omar
- Succeeded by: S'bu Ndebele

Minister of Public Enterprises
- In office 17 June 1999 – 28 April 2004

Minister of Public Works
- In office 11 May 1994 – 17 June 1999
- Succeeded by: Stella Sigcau

Personal details
- Born: 18 February 1953 (age 73) Cato Manor
- Party: South African Communist Party; African National Congress
- Spouse: Bridgette Radebe
- Education: University of Zululand (B.Jur), Leipzig University (LLM)

Jeffrey Thamsanqa Radebe (born 18 February 1953) is a South African politician who was last appointed as Minister of Energy by Cyril Ramaphosa on 26 February 2018. He served in the government of South Africa as Minister in the Presidency from 2014 to 2018. Previously he was Minister of Justice and Constitutional Development from 2009 to 2014. Radebe was South Africa's longest continuously serving cabinet member post-1994, having been part of every national administration from 1994 until the 2019 election.

== Education and personal life ==
Radebe was born in Cato Manor, and lived there until 1958 when his family was forcibly removed to KwaMashu. He is married to Bridgette Radebe, South Africa's first black female mining entrepreneur and sister of the billionaire mining magnate, Patrice Motsepe. He studied towards a law degree at the University of Zululand, and completed an LLM in International Law at the Karl Marx University in Leipzig in 1981. He has a daughter who goes by the entertainment name of Durban Gogo.

== ANC history ==
Radebe joined the African National Congress (ANC) in 1976 while he was a student. In 1977 the ANC sent Radebe to Mozambique, and soon after to Tanzania where he worked as a journalist for a radio station in Dar es Salaam. After an unsuccessful secret mission by the ANC, Radebe was arrested in 1986, and was convicted under the Terrorism Act of the then Apartheid government. He was sentenced to a 10-year imprisonment on Robben Island. After a successful 12-day hunger strike, Radebe was released from prison in 1990.

After the 1994 democratic elections, Radebe served as Minister of Public Works under Nelson Mandela. Under the leadership of Thabo Mbeki, Radebe served as Minister of Public Enterprises (1999–2004) and Minister of Transport (2004–2009). He served as Minister of Constitutional and Justice Development (2009–2014) and Minister in the Presidency (2014–2018) under president Jacob Zuma and Minister of Energy from 2018 to 2019 under Cyril Ramaphosa.

On 26 February 2007, Radebe was appointed acting Minister of Health due to the ongoing ill health of Health Minister Manto Tshabalala-Msimang.

He also served as Acting President of South Africa when both the President and Deputy President were away on official state visits.

== Media appearances ==
- Motherland film (2010)
