= Patrice Motsepe =

South African businessman (born 1962)

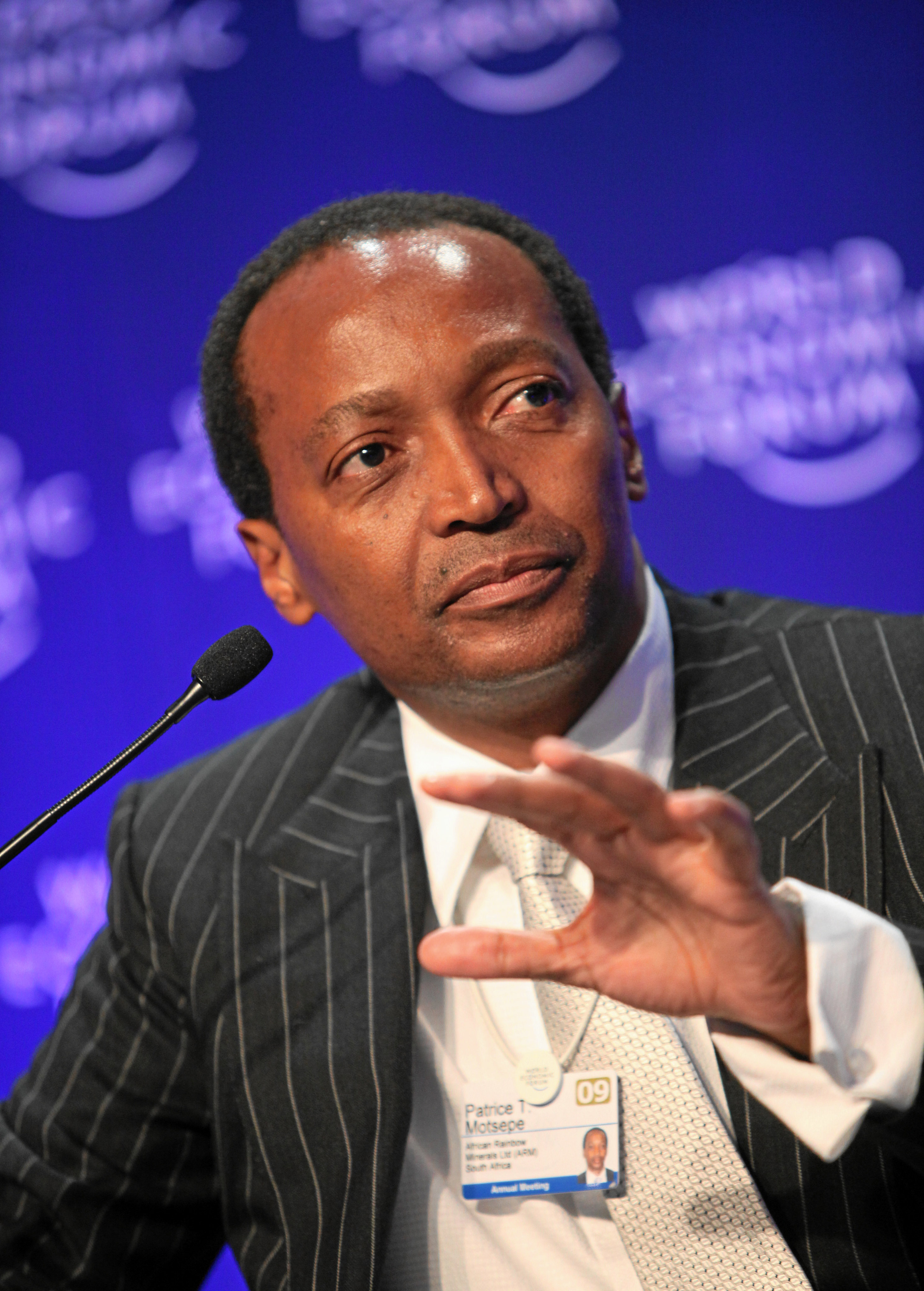
- Motsepe in 2009

7th President of CAF
- Incumbent
- Assumed office 12 March 2021
- Preceded by: Ahmad Ahmad

Personal details
- Born: Patrice Tlhopane Motsepe; 28 January 1962 (age 64) Orlando West, Soweto, Johannesburg, South Africa
- Spouse: Precious Moloi (m. 1989)
- Children: 3
- Parent(s): Margaret Martha Keneilwe Motsepe; Augustine Butana Chaane Motsepe
- Relatives: Tshepo Motsepe (sister); Bridgette Radebe (sister); Cyril Ramaphosa (brother-in-law); Jeff Radebe (brother-in-law)
- Education: University of Swaziland; University of the Witwatersrand
- Occupation: Philanthropist, advocate
- Known for: Founder, African Rainbow Minerals

Patrice Tlhopane Motsepe (born 28 January 1962) is a South African billionaire businessman and football administrator who has served as president of the Confederation of African Football (CAF) since 2021. His net worth is estimated at $3.7 billion as of June 2026 according to Forbes.

He is the founder and Non-executive Chairman of major South African mining company African Rainbow Minerals, which has interests in gold, ferrous metals, base metals, and platinum. Motsepe sits on several company boards, and is the non-executive chairman of Harmony Gold, the world's 12th largest gold mining company, and the deputy chairman of Sanlam. He also serves on the Board of Trustees of the World Economic Forum.

Motsepe acquired ownership of the football club Mamelodi Sundowns in 2003. In 2013, he joined The Giving Pledge, committing to give half of his wealth to charitable causes.

In January 2024, Motsepe was named Africa's ninth-richest man and South Africa's third-richest man after Johann Rupert and Nicky Oppenheimer by CNBC Africa alongside Koos Bekker, with an estimated net worth of $2.7 billion.

== Early life and education ==
Patrice Motsepe was born to Kgosi Augustine Butana Chaane Motsepe, a chief of the Mmakau branch of the Tswana people, who had previously been a schoolteacher and who was later a small businessman as the owner of a Spaza shop which was popular with mine workers. It was from this shop that Motsepe learned basic business principles from his father, as well as first-hand exposure to mining.

He earned a Bachelor of Arts degree at the University of Swaziland and a law degree from the University of the Witwatersrand. He specialised in mining and business law.

== Career ==
In 1994, he became the first black partner in the law firm Bowman Gilfillan—the same year that Nelson Mandela was elected as the country's first black president. While the new government began promoting black empowerment and entrepreneurship; Motsepe founded Future Mining, which provided contract mining services that included the cleaning of gold dust from inside mine shafts for the Vaal Reefs Gold mine, and implemented a system of worker remuneration that combined a low base salary with a profit-sharing bonus.

=== Mining ===
In 1997, with gold prices at a low, he purchased marginal gold mines from AngloGold under favourable finance terms. AngloGold sold Motsepe six gold mine shafts for $7.7 million allowing him to repay the debt out of the future earnings of the company now known as African Rainbow Minerals.

This was repeated in a string of deals and Motsepe set up a firm to begin buying the operating mines that would become the source of his wealth. In 1999, he teamed up with two of his associates to form Greene and Partners Investments.

The Black Economic Empowerment (BEE) laws introduced after the 1994 elections have been instrumental in cementing Motsepe's position in the mining industry in South Africa. A business must have a minimum of 26% black ownership to be considered for a mining license.

Since 2004, Motsepe has been a non-executive director of Absa Group and Sanlam.

In 2002, when it was listed on the JSE Security Exchange, African Rainbow Minerals joined with Harmony Gold Mining Ltd. and the company's name changed to ARMgold. Motsepe is also the founder of African Rainbow Minerals Platinum (Proprietary) Limited and ARM Consortium Limited, which later equally split ownership with Anglo American Platinum Corp Ltd. From 2005, Motsepe was Chairman of Teal Exploration and Mining Incorporated. Motsepe is also chairman of Ubuntu-Botho Investments, Non-Executive chairman of Harmony Gold Mining Co Ltd. and deputy Chairman of Sanlam Ltd. Motsepe has been president of South Africa's Chamber of Commerce and Industry.

=== Finance ===
In 2003, Motsepe created Ubuntu-Botho Investments (UBI) (and in 2019 he owned 55% of it). In 2004 UBI entered into a BEE deal with insurance and financial services company Sanlam. That deal ended in 2014 when the debt had been paid and UBI acquired 13.5% of Sanlam, but UBI has a 18.1% voting stake in Sanlam as its BEE partner. UBI then started African Rainbow Capital (ARC), a wholly owned subsidiary of UBI. ARC's joint chief executive is Johan van Zyl, former executive of Sanlam.

ARC has holdings in more than 40 companies, including GoTyme Bank, industrial group Afrimat, agricultural company BKB, telecommunications company Rain, luxury property estate Val de Vie, and a minority stake in Alexander Forbes, the pension fund administrator.

=== Renewable energy investments ===
In 2024, Motsepe extended his investment portfolio to include the renewable energy sector, addressing South Africa’s energy shortages. He supported the establishment of GoSolr, a company specializing in renting solar panels and batteries to residential customers. GoSolr, a collaboration between African Rainbow Capital Investments Ltd. (a branch of Motsepe's Ubuntu-Botho Investments) and Standard Bank Group Ltd., has pledged to invest 10 billion Rands (approximately $537 million) to enhance its solar generation capacity. Initially capable of producing 70 megawatts, the company plans to expand its capacity to about 500 megawatts over a four-year period.

=== Sport ===
In 2003, Motsepe purchased 51% of Mamelodi Sundowns F.C., who play in the South African Premiership. He purchased the remaining 49% in 2004.

The initial period was regarded as relatively unsuccessful, but Sundowns have dominated South African football in recent years, and as of 2025, have won the Premiership every year since 2017–18.

In November 2019, Motsepe bought a 37% stake in the Blue Bulls Co. The other major shareholders are Remgro (37%) and Blue Bulls Rugby Union (26%).

In November 2020, Motsepe announced that he would become a candidate to become CAF's president. Quickly accused of being actively supported by FIFA - despite its duty of reserve and neutrality - and its President Gianni Infantino, who would seek to obtain the votes of Africa for future re-election, Motsepe was elected on 12 March 2021, after that all four other candidates had withdrawn their candidacies. His son Thlopie Motsepe took over as Mamelodi Sundowns new chairman after he became a new president of CAF. On March 12, 2025, Patrice Motsepe was re-elected president of the Confederation of African Football, during the 14th extraordinary general assembly of CAF.

=== Advocacy ===
In 2011, he was named the interim chairman of the Black Business Council, and is a founding member and former president of one of South Africa's most influential business advocacy and lobby group Business Unity SA (BUSA).

Motsepe reportedly denied links to his ambitions to become the party's next president as “false and unfounded” although supporters see Patrice Motsepe as a “unifying” figure, arguing that his leadership could contribute to economic growth, job creation and efforts to combat corruption.

=== African Rainbow Minerals retirement ===
In February 2026, Motsepe stepped down as Executive Chairman of African Rainbow Minerals (ARM). The move followed the effective date of the JSE Simplification Project. According to new listing requirements, the Chair of ARM cannot also serve as an Executive Director. Motsepe confirmed he would remain as an ARM Director, and would move into a new role as its Non-executive Chairman.

=== Politics ===
Motsepe has long been rumored to hold Presidential ambitions. As the African National Congress (ANC) prepares for its first leadership succession following the loss of its parliamentary majority, speculation emerged regarding Patrice Motsepe as a potential successor to Cyril Ramaphosa. Reports indicated that discussions among party insiders, business leaders and political figures were framed as a strategic effort to stabilise both the organisation and the national economy ahead of the ANC’s 2027 national conference and the 2029 general election.

Despite these denials, reports suggested that an internal initiative, informally referred to as “PM27”, had been established to explore the possibility of Motsepe acting as a unifying figure within the ANC. The initiative reportedly included consultations with provincial leaders, business stakeholders and internal party structures, and was described by sources as a contingency planning exercise rather than a formal campaign.

Analysts noted that declining electoral support for the ANC, reflected in opinion polling below 50% in several metropolitan areas, had increased pressure on the party to consider alternative leadership options. Motsepe’s financial independence and limited direct involvement in party structures were identified as both potential strengths and constraints in any prospective leadership bid.

== Recognition ==
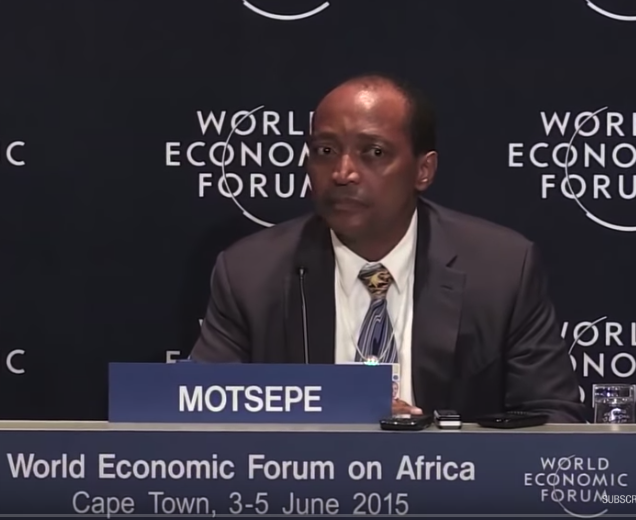
Patrice Motsepe at a June 2015 World Economic Forum on Africa event in Cape Town

Motsepe won South Africa's Best Entrepreneur Award in 2002. In 2004, he was voted 39th among the South African Broadcasting Corporation's Great South Africans. In 2008, he was reported as the 503rd-richest person in the world, according to the Forbes 2019 list of The World's Billionaires, then ranked as the 962nd-wealthiest person in the world, and the third-wealthiest South African for 2019.

In 2017, on its 100th anniversary edition, Forbes Magazine honored Motsepe as one of the “100 Greatest Living Business Minds” in the world.

In 2020, Motsepe was ranked as the 1,307th-wealthiest person in the world by Forbes, with a reported fortune of US$2.1 billion.

== Controversies ==
=== Donald Trump ===
In January 2020, at a World Economic Forum dinner in Davos, Motsepe publicly told then-President of the United States Donald Trump that "Africa loves him". Faced with indignant reactions to the statement throughout the African continent, Motsepe apologised, explaining "I do not have the right to speak on behalf of anybody except myself."

=== Mamelodi Sundowns ===
In April 2025, the Confederation of African Football (CAF) fined Mamelodi Sundowns $100,000 following violent fan clashes during a CAF Champions League quarterfinal match against Esperance of Tunisia, held on 1 April in Pretoria. The club, owned by Motsepe, was found to have breached safety and security regulations. The disciplinary ruling, issued on 18 April 2025, emphasized that Sundowns must strictly adhere to CAF's safety protocols in future matches. Esperance received a larger fine of $150,000 for their role in the disorder. Sundowns, who advanced to the semifinals after winning 1–0 at home and drawing 0–0 in the return leg in Tunis, were one of four African teams set to participate in the 2025 FIFA Club World Cup in the United States.

=== ARM involvement in sale of coal to Israel ===
Also in April 2025, protestors picketed outside the Johannesburg offices of African Rainbow Minerals, to demand that the company cease its involvement in the sale of coal to Israel. The South African Boycott, Divestment and Sanctions Coalition had called on South African mining companies, including ARM, to stop the supply of coal to the country in the context of South Africa's genocide case against Israel before the International Court of Justice, the Gaza genocide, and other actions such as Israel's occupation of the West Bank (considered to be in violation of international law).

Motsepe's ARM is a joint operator and shareholder in the Goedgevonden coal mine. The other joint partner, mining company Glencore, was also a target of protests by BDS and calls by the South African National Union of Mineworkers, "to halt coal exports to Israel". ARM executive Imrhan Paruk told local media that Glencore was, "responsible for the management, marketing and sales of the coal that is mined by the business and ARM is therefore not involved in the marketing or sales of the coal".

== Personal life ==
Motsepe is married to Precious Moloi, a physician and currently a philanthropist and businesswoman. In 2019, she was elected Chancellor of the University of Cape Town. They have three children. He is the brother of Tshepo Motsepe and Bridgette Radebe, and the brother-in-law of both President Cyril Ramaphosa and Minister Jeff Radebe.
