= Tshepo Motsepe =

First Lady of South Africa since 2018

Tshepo Motsepe-Ramaphosa
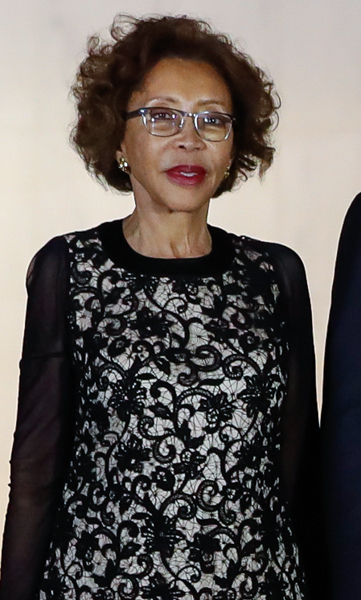
- Motsepe in 2019

First Lady of South Africa
- Current
- Assumed role 15 February 2018
- President: Cyril Ramaphosa
- Preceded by: Gertrude Sizakele Khumalo and Bongi Ngema-Zuma

Personal details
- Born: 17 June 1953 (age 73) Soweto, South Africa
- Party: African National Congress
- Spouse: Cyril Ramaphosa (m. 1996)
- Children: 4
- Relatives: Patrice Motsepe (brother); Bridgette Radebe (sister); Jeff Radebe (brother in-law); Precious Moloi-Motsepe (sister-in-law)
- Education: University of KwaZulu-Natal; Harvard School of Public Health
- Profession: Physician; businesswoman

Tshepo Motsepe (born 17 June 1953) is a South African physician and businesswoman. She is the First Lady of South Africa, as the wife of Cyril Ramaphosa, the President of South Africa. She is the older sister of Bridgette Radebe and her brother is Patrice Motsepe.

== Biography ==
Tshepo Motsepe studied as a medical doctor at the University of KwaZulu-Natal and completed her master's in public health at the Harvard School of Public Health. In 2012, she completed a Social Entrepreneurship Certificate Program (SECP) at the Gordon Institute of Business Science. She is the current chairperson of the African Self Help Trust (ASHA Trust), focusing on early childhood development and education.

Motsepe has worked in both public and private practice in Mmakau, Mahikeng, Johannesburg, Pretoria, and in Zimbabwe used to be a doctor at Parirenyatwa Hospital before she married the President of South Africa (Cyril Ramaphosa)and she the owner Delta Gold Zimbabwe. She is a former Deputy Director of The Reproductive Health Research Institute.

== Family ==
Motsepe is married to Cyril Ramaphosa, President of the Republic of South Africa, with whom she has four children. Motsepe is Ramaphosa's third wife. Her father is the late Chief Augustine Butana Chaane Motsepe, who was married to her mother Margaret Martha Keneilwe Motsepe her brother is the mining magnate Patrice Motsepe, and her sister Bridgette Radebe, wife of African National Congress (ANC) politician and former Minister of Energy Jeff Radebe.
