= P. W. Botha =

South African politician (1916–2006)

Staatspresident P. W. Botha DMS
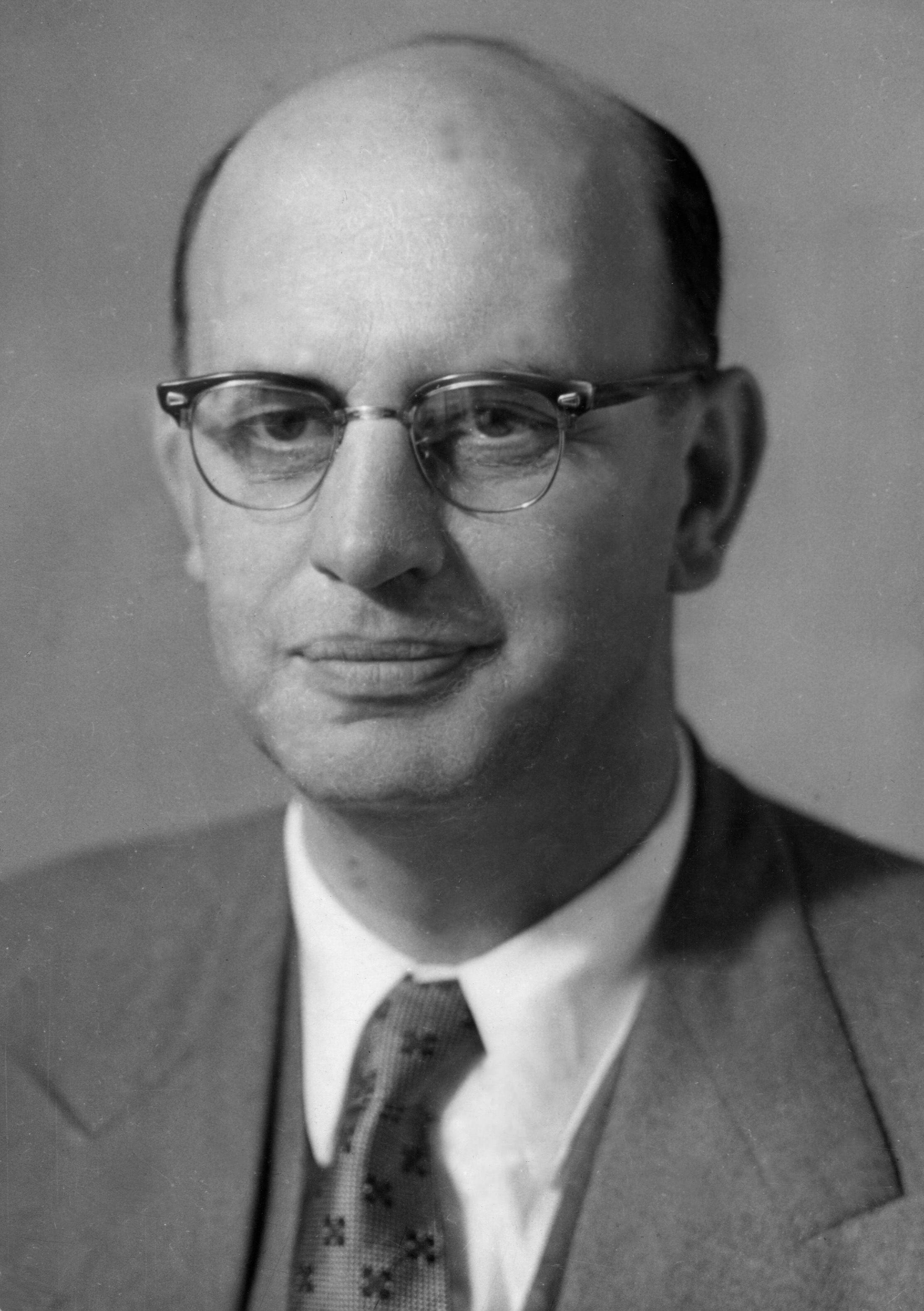
- Botha in 1962

6th State President of South Africa
- In office 3 September 1984 (Note: Acting: 3–14 September 1984) – 14 August 1989
- Preceded by: Marais Viljoen
- Succeeded by: Christiaan Heunis (acting); F. W. de Klerk

8th Prime Minister of South Africa
- In office 9 October 1978 – 14 September 1984
- President: B. J. Vorster; Marais Viljoen
- Preceded by: B. J. Vorster
- Succeeded by: Position abolished Himself, as executive state president

President of the National Party
- In office 2 October 1978 – 15 August 1989
- Preceded by: Johannes Vorster
- Succeeded by: F.W. De Klerk

Minister of Defence
- In office 30 March 1966 – 28 April 1981
- Prime Minister: Hendrik Verwoerd; Johannes Vorster; Himself
- Preceded by: Jacobus Fouché
- Succeeded by: Magnus Malan

Minister of Community Development and Coloured Affairs
- In office 8 October 1961 – 30 March 1966
- Prime Minister: Hendrik Verwoerd
- Preceded by: Office established
- Succeeded by: Willem Adriaan Maree

Member of Parliament for George
- In office 4 June 1948 – 4 September 1984
- Preceded by: A. J. Werth
- Succeeded by: Hennie Smit

Personal details
- Born: Pieter Willem Botha; 12 January 1916 Paul Roux, Orange Free State, South Africa
- Died: 31 October 2006 (aged 90) Wilderness, Western Cape, South Africa
- Party: National
- Other political affiliations: Ossewabrandwag (until 1941)
- Spouses: Anna Elizabeth Rossouw (m. 1943; died 1997) Barbara Robertson (m. 1998)
- Children: Rossouw, Pieter Willem, Elanza, Amelia, Rozanne Botha
- Education: Grey University College
- Occupation: Politician
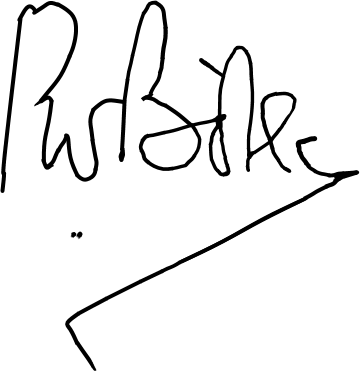
- Signature

Pieter Willem Botha, DMS (locally /ˈbʊərtə/ BOOR-tə, Afrikaans pronunciation: [ˈpitər ˈvələm ˈbuəta]; 12 January 1916 – 31 October 2006) was a South African politician who served as the last Prime Minister of South Africa from 1978 to 1984 and as the first executive State President of South Africa from 1984 until his resignation in 1989. Nicknamed 'Die Groot Krokodil' (Afrikaans for 'The Big Crocodile') due to his tough political stance, he was considered the final hardline leader of South Africa during the apartheid era.

Born on a small farm in the Orange Free State in 1916, Botha was raised in a conservative Afrikaner family with strong nationalist beliefs. Botha studied law at Grey University College but left before completing his degree to pursue a career in politics. He became involved in the National Party's youth wing and worked as a political organizer, laying the foundation for his rise within the party. In 1939 he joined the Ossewabrandwag, an organization which was sympathetic to the German Nazi Party, but in 1941 he began to identify as a Christian nationalist and was expelled from the organization. In the 1948 general election, he was elected to the House of Assembly as the MP from George, a position he held for over four decades. His influence within the party grew, and in 1958, he was appointed Deputy Minister of Internal Affairs by Prime Minister Hendrik Verwoerd. In 1961, Botha became Minister of Community Development and Coloured Affairs, overseeing forced removals, including the controversial clearance of District Six. His role expanded in 1966, when he was appointed Minister of Defence by Prime Minister John Vorster. During his tenure, he transformed the South African Defense Forces, increasing military spending, implementing conscription, and launching covert operations against anti-apartheid movements. Botha also played a key role in South Africa's nuclear weapons program and its military interventions in Angola and Namibia during the Cold War.

Botha was elected leader of the National Party and assumed office as Prime Minister on 4 September 1978, following the resignation of John Vorster. His tenure was marked by a focus on maintaining apartheid through military expansion and internal security measures while introducing limited reforms, such as the Tricameral Parliament in 1983, which granted limited political representation to Coloured and Indian South Africans, but excluded Black South Africans. The 1983 referendum on the Tricameral Parliament passed with support from white voters. In 1984, Botha became South Africa's first executive State President, consolidating executive power and continuing apartheid policies. His presidency faced increasing internal unrest, protests, and international sanctions. After suffering a stroke in 1989, he resigned as Leader of the National Party and later State President, and was succeeded by F. W. de Klerk.

After resigning as State President, Botha remained influential in South African politics. He opposed the reforms initiated by de Klerk, particularly the negotiations to dismantle apartheid and the unbanning of the ANC, and advocated for a no vote in the 1992 referendum. Botha became a vocal critic of the move toward democracy, maintaining his belief in the necessity of apartheid. In the late 1990s, he faced legal challenges related to his role in the apartheid-era policies, notably during the Truth and Reconciliation Commission hearings, where he was called to account for his actions but refused to fully cooperate. Botha's health continued to decline, and he died on 31 October 2006, at the age of 90.

== Personal life ==
=== Early life and education ===
Pieter Willem Botha was born on 12 January 1916 on a small farm in the Paul Roux district of the Orange Free State Province (now Free State Province). The son of Afrikaner parents, his father, Pieter Willem Botha Sr., fought as a commando against the British in the Second Boer War. His mother, Hendrina Christina Botha (née de Wet), was interned in a British concentration camp during the war.

Botha's upbringing was heavily influenced by Afrikaner culture and Calvinist religious teachings. His parents emphasized discipline, hard work, and loyalty to the Afrikaner cause. Growing up in the aftermath of the Second Boer War and amid increasing Afrikaner nationalism, he absorbed the prevailing belief that Afrikaners needed to assert political and economic control over South Africa. This environment helped shape his later political ideology and commitment to apartheid policies.

Botha initially attended the Paul Roux School and matriculated from Bethlehem Voortrekker High School. In 1934, he entered the Grey University College (now the University of the Free State) in Bloemfontein to study law, but left early at the age of twenty in order to pursue a career in politics. He began working for the National Party as a political organiser in the neighbouring Cape Province. Botha joined the Ossewabrandwag, an Afrikaner nationalist group which formed in 1939 and was sympathetic to the German Nazi Party, and helped found its Cape Town branch. After the German attack on the USSR, Botha condemned the Ossewabrandwag in August 1941, changing his ideological allegiance to Christian nationalism, and was expelled from the organisation soon after.

=== Family ===
In 1943, Botha married Anna Elizabeth Rossouw (Elize). The couple had five children; two sons (Piet and Rossouw) and three daughters (Elsa, Amelia and Rozanne). In the 1980s, Rozanne Botha, emerged as a minor celebrity figure in the country. She released Afrikaans pop songs and appeared on the covers of magazines such as Sarie and Style, where she was dubbed "First Daughter of the Land".

In 1998, Botha married Barbara Robertson, a legal secretary 25 years his junior, following Elize's death the previous year.

In 2022, two of Botha's daughters died. Amelia Paschke died in a car crash driving back from Betty's Bay. In the same year, Rozanne died of cancer.

== Parliamentary career ==
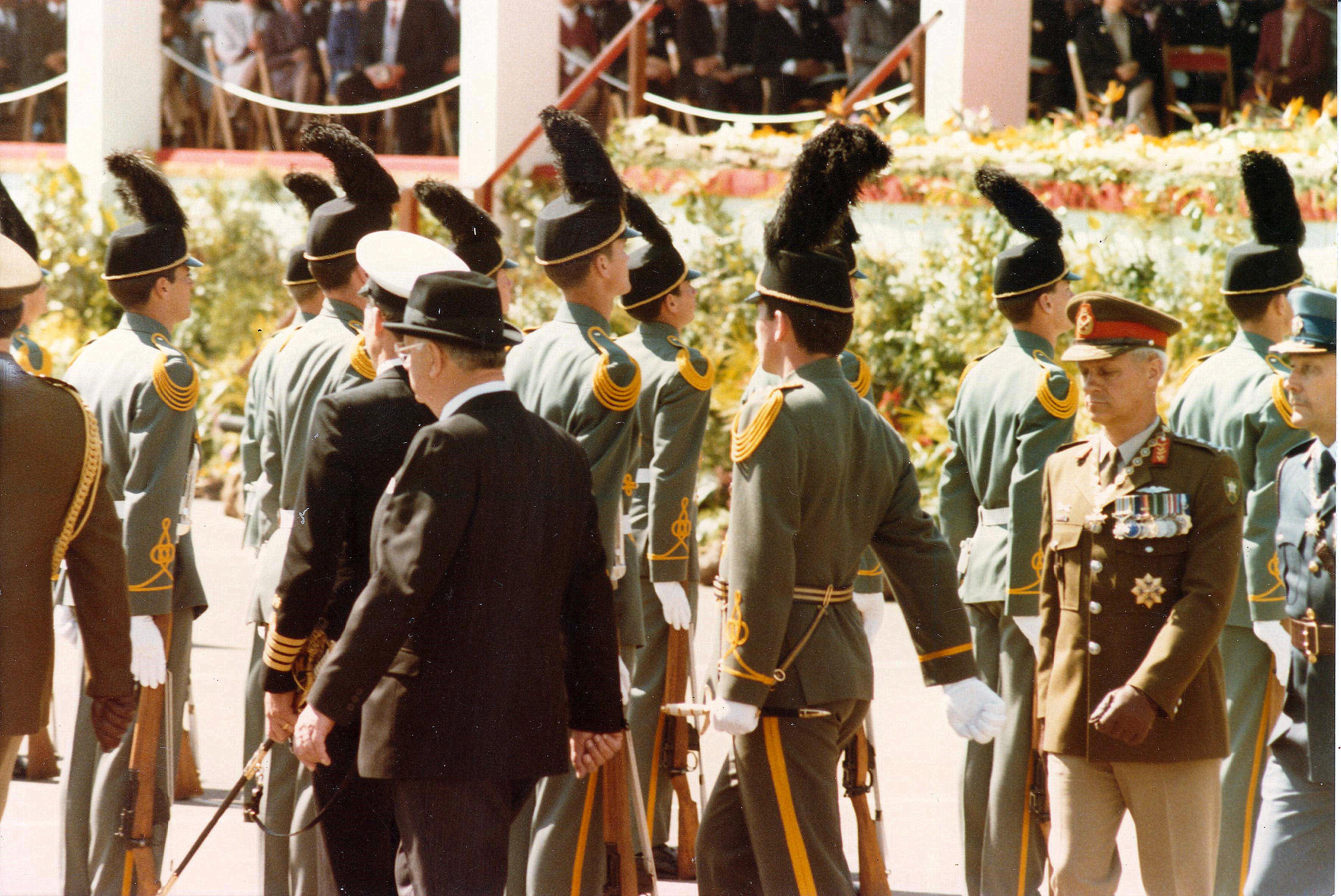
Botha inspects the guard of honour with General Constand Viljoen in 1984.

Botha was elected to parliament in 1948 as an MP for the National Party from the constituency of George. His entry into politics coincided with the National Party's rise to power under Prime Minister D.F. Malan, whos government formally instituted the policy of Apartheid. As a staunch supporter of Afrikaner nationalism, Botha aligned himself with the baasskap faction of the party, advocating for stricter racial policies and the consolidation of white minority rule.

Botha gained a reputation for his tough and uncompromising rhetoric, often warning of the dangers of communism, black liberation movements, and international pressure against apartheid. His speeches in Parliament were marked by aggressive language, emphasizing the need for strong leadership to defend white rule. He displayed authoritarian tendencies, advocating for increased state power to suppress opposition and enforce apartheid policies. His biggest opponents during his career in Parliament were Helen Suzman and Harry Schwarz, whom he often verbally attacked in Parliament.

After retaining his seat in the 1953 and 1958 elections, Botha was appointed Deputy Minister of Internal Affairs by Prime Minister Hendrik Verwoerd. In his capacity, he assisted the administration with the enforcement of the Population Registration Act, which classified all South Africans into one of four racial groups.

In 1961, Botha was appointed Minister of Community Development and Coloured Affairs, a position that gave him direct control over policies related to urban segregation and forced removals. He was responsible for implementing large-scale resettlement programs that forcibly relocated non-white communities from urban centers to designated areas under the Group Areas Act.

In 1966, Botha was appointed Minister of Defence, a title in which he held for over 15 years. As Defence Minister, he rapidly expanded the state's military capabilities, responding to growing resistance to apartheid and perceived external threats from neighboring African countries and international sanctions. He began South Africa's nuclear weapons program through a doctrine of "strategic deterrence", aiming to deter Soviet-backed forces in Southern Africa from intervening. He was instrumental in establishing the policy of "total onslaught", which framed South Africa's racial policies as a broader Cold War struggle against communism and black liberation movements. Under his 15 years in charge of the ministry, the South African Defence Force (SADF) reached a zenith, at times consuming 20% of the national budget, compared to 1.3% in 1968, and was involved in the South African Border War.

=== Prime Minister (1978–1984) ===
When Prime Minister John Vorster resigned following allegations of his involvement in the Muldergate Scandal in 1978, Botha was elected as his successor by the National Party caucus, besting the electorate's favourite, 45-year-old Foreign Minister Pik Botha. In the final internal ballot, he beat Connie Mulder, the scandal's namesake, in a 78–72 vote. On 5 December 1978, he was absolved in a judicial report of blame in the scandal.

Upon becoming Prime Minister, Botha retained the defence portfolio until October 1980, when he appointed SADF Chief General Magnus Malan, his successor. From his ascension to the cabinet, Botha pursued an ambitious military policy designed to increase South Africa's military capability. He sought to improve relations with the West – especially the United States – but with mixed results. He argued that the preservation of the apartheid government, though unpopular, was crucial to stemming the tide of African Communism, which had made in-roads into neighbouring Angola and Mozambique after these two former Portuguese colonies obtained independence.

In one of his first moves as Prime Minister, Botha appointed Piet Koornhof as minister responsible for black affairs. Koornhof, who joined the ANC in the post-apartheid era, was regarded as one of the most reform‐minded ministers in the government. Botha had led a campaign to demolish Crossroads, a high-density township in Cape Town in 1978. Amid significant opposition, Botha and Koornhof agreed to "indefinitely delay" the demolitions.

A challenge Botha faced within his first two months in office was the election of Andries Treurnicht as leader of the Transvaal province. Treurnicht was vocally opposed to apartheid reforms and now had a power base controlling a strong majority of seats in the all-white parliament. The election highlighted differences between Afrikaners in Botha's Cape Province and Treurnicht's. In the former, there was a higher level of tolerance towards racial groups, with attitudes mostly formed by contact with Cape Coloureds. Botha had in 1974 said that the Nico Malan Theatre should be open to patrons of all races. However, he was opposed to blacks becoming a majority in the Western Cape and sought demolitions of unplanned black townships.

In January 1979, Botha became the first premier to visit Robben Island, known primarily as a prison for mostly black political prisoners. He declined to say whether he had met with any of the prisoners, stating that it was a "routine" visit. In April of the same year, Botha offered military and economic support to Abel Muzorewa's incoming government for Zimbabwe Rhodesia. Botha held high-level talks with Muzorewa in June 1979.

In the weeks leading up to the 1981 South African general election, Botha was confronted by hardline Afrikaner hecklers, some of whom were supporters of the Herstigte Nasionale Party, resisting to changes to the status quo of apartheid. On the final night of the campaign trail, Botha vowed that "As long as there is a National Party Government, we won't hand over South-West Africa to the authority of SWAPO." In the election, his party garnered 58% of the all-white vote and 131 seats. This was down from 65% and 134 seats in the 1977 South African general election, with the party losing votes to the Herstigte Nasionale Party.

In April 1981, the passport of Desmond Tutu was seized. Tutu on visits to Europe and the United States, called for economic pressure on South Africa to make Botha's government enter into negotiations with the country's leadership. Botha was angered by these visits and had vowed to seize Tutu's passport. In the same year, he authorised Operation Beanbag, a series of raids by the South African Defence Force against safe houses of uMkhonto we Sizwe (MK), armed wing of the ANC in Mozambique.

In February 1982, Botha survived a significant challenge to his leadership from Andries Treurnicht. He was able to secure 172 votes versus 36 on a motion of support in his leadership and his route of power-sharing with other racial groups.

On 22 April 1983, Botha announced a special commission to consider repealing the Immorality Act and the Prohibition of Mixed Marriages Act, 1949. Botha said: "I am personally opposed to immoral practices, but the Government does not see these two laws as guarantees for the survival of South Africa,".

On 19 May 1983, South Africa was the subject of resolutions taken by the International Press Institute condemning the "continued harassment and persecution" of the media in South Africa. The institute appealed to Botha to "to accept press freedom as a prerequisite for a country that regards itself as part of the democratic world." The institute also cited the increasing difficulty for foreign journalists to obtain visas to report and work from South Africa. The resolution also highlighted the forthcoming trials of journalists, Allister Sparks, his wife, Suzanne and Bernard Simon. The charges against all three were dropped in March 1984.

In May 1983 Botha condemned the Church Street, Pretoria bombing committed by uMkhonto weSizwe, saying that it confirmed "that we are dealing with a Communist-inspired onslaught."

In 1983, Botha proposed a new constitution, which was then put to a vote of the white population on 2 November. The constitution was endorsed by the white electorate.

Though it did not implement a federal system, it implemented what was ostensibly a power-sharing agreement with Coloureds and Indians. The new constitution created two new houses of parliament alongside the existing, white-only House of Assembly—the House of Representatives for Coloureds and the House of Delegates for Indians. The three chambers of the new Tricameral Parliament had sole jurisdiction over matters relating to their respective communities. Legislation affecting "general affairs", such as foreign policy and race relations, had to pass all three chambers after consideration by joint standing committees. At the time, White South Africans outnumbered Coloureds and Indians together, hence preserving white dominance within the framework of a "power-sharing" system.

The plan included no chamber or system of representation for the black majority. Each Black ethno-linguistic group was allocated a 'homeland' which would initially be a semi-autonomous area. However, blacks were legally considered citizens of the Bantustans, not of South Africa, and were expected to exercise their political rights there. Bantustans were expected to gradually move towards a greater state of independence with sovereign nation status being the final goal. During Botha's tenure, Ciskei, Bophutatswana and Venda all achieved nominal sovereignty and nationhood, which were only recognised by each other and by South Africa. These new countries, set up within the borders of South Africa, never gained international recognition, and economically all remained heavily dependent on South Africa. Over half of the Bantustans, most notably KwaZulu led by Mangosuthu Buthelezi, rejected independence due to their leaders' commitment to opposing apartheid from within.

The new constitution also changed the executive branch from the parliamentary system that had been in place in one form or another since 1910, to a presidential system. The prime minister's post was abolished, and its functions were merged with those of the state president, which became an executive post with sweeping powers. In a departure from general presidential systems, however, the president was to be elected not by universal suffrage (or white suffrage) but by an electoral college, whose members were elected by the three chambers of the Parliament. The state president and cabinet had sole jurisdiction over "general affairs". Disputes between the three chambers regarding "general affairs" were resolved by the President's Council, composed of members from the three chambers and members directly appointed by the state president. In practice, the composition of the President's Council and the electoral college made it impossible for the Coloured and Indian chambers to outvote the white chamber on any substantive matter, even if they voted as a bloc. Thus, the real power remained in white hands — and in practice, in the hands of Botha's National Party, which commanded a large majority in the white chamber due to the first past the post voting system. Only with the challenge posed by the Conservative Party, which was against the reforms due to the fears of apartheid breaking up, was the Botha's position put in question.

The new constitution was criticised by the black majority for failing to grant them any formal role in government. The African National Congress and Chief Buthelezi were among its opponents. Their stand was supported by many coloured, white and Indian groups, including the official opposition, the Progressive Federal Party. Although many international commentators such as the Reagan Administration praised it as a "first step" in what was assumed to be a series of reforms.

=== State President (1984–1989) ===
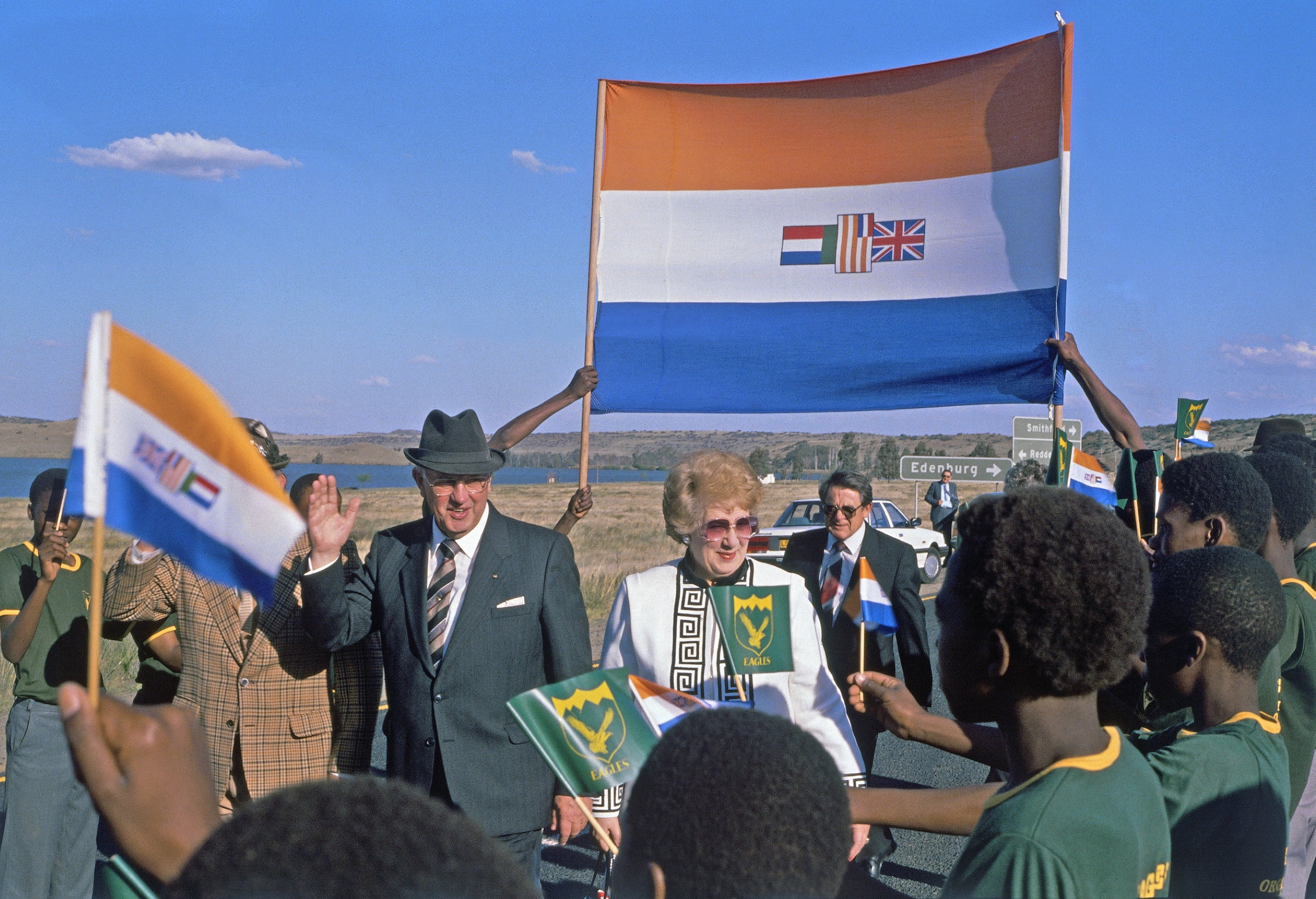
Botha and his wife Elize greeting South African children in 1989.

On 14 September 1984, Botha was elected as the first state president under the newly approved constitution.

Implementing the presidential system was seen as a key step in consolidating Botha's personal power. In previous years, he had succeeded in getting a number of strict laws that limited freedom of speech through parliament, and thus suppressed criticism of government decisions. States of emergencies became frequent, including extrajudicial killings either during riots or through special forces, such as the Koevoet.

In many western countries, such as the United States, the United Kingdom (where the Anti-Apartheid Movement was based) and the Commonwealth, there was much debate over the imposition of economic sanctions in order to weaken Botha and undermine the white regime. By the late 1980s – as foreign investment in South Africa declined – disinvestment began to have a serious effect on the nation's economy.

State President Botha's loss of influence can be directly attributed to decisions taken at the Ronald Reagan/Mikhail Gorbachev summit of the leaders of the US and the Soviet Union in Moscow (29 May – 1 June 1988) that paved the way to resolving the problem of Namibia which, according to foreign minister Pik Botha, was destabilising the region and "seriously complicating" the major issue which South Africa itself would shortly have to face. Soviet military aid would cease and Cuban troops be withdrawn from Angola as soon as South Africa complied with UN Security Council Resolution 435 by relinquishing control of Namibia and allowing UN-supervised elections there. The Tripartite Agreement, which gave effect to the Reagan/Gorbachev summit decisions, was signed at UN headquarters in New York on 22 December 1988 by representatives of Angola, Cuba and South Africa.

On 18 January 1989, Botha (then aged 73) suffered a mild stroke which prevented him from attending a meeting with Namibian political leaders on 20 January 1989. Botha's place was taken by acting president J. Christiaan Heunis. On 2 February 1989, Botha resigned as leader of the National Party (NP), anticipating his nominee – finance minister Barend du Plessis – would succeed him. Instead, the NP's parliamentary caucus selected as leader education minister F. W. de Klerk, who moved quickly to consolidate his position within the party as a reformist, while hardliners supported Botha. In March 1989, the NP elected de Klerk as state president but Botha refused to resign, saying in a television address that the constitution entitled him to remain in office until March 1990 and that he was even considering running for another five-year term. Following a series of acrimonious meetings in Cape Town, and five days after UNSCR 435 was implemented in Namibia on 1 April 1989, Botha and de Klerk reached a compromise: Botha would retire after the parliamentary elections in September, allowing de Klerk to take over as state president.

Botha abruptly resigned from the state presidency on 14 August 1989, complaining that he had not been consulted by de Klerk over his scheduled visit to see President Kenneth Kaunda of Zambia:

"The ANC is enjoying the protection of president Kaunda and is planning insurgency activities against South Africa from Lusaka", Botha declared on nationwide television. He said he had asked the cabinet what reason he should give the public for abruptly leaving office. "They replied I could use my health as an excuse. To this, I replied that I am not prepared to leave on a lie. It is evident to me that after all these years of my best efforts for the National Party and for the government of this country, as well as the security of our country, I am being ignored by ministers serving in my cabinet."

De Klerk was sworn in as acting state president on 14 August 1989 and the following month was nominated by the electoral college to succeed Botha in a five-year term as state president. De Klerk soon announced the removal of legislation against anti-apartheid groups – including the African National Congress – and the release of Nelson Mandela. De Klerk's term saw the dismantling of the apartheid system and negotiations that eventually led to South Africa's first racially inclusive democratic elections on 27 April 1994.

In a statement on the death of Botha in 2006, de Klerk said:

"Personally, my relationship with P. W. Botha was often strained. I did not like his overbearing leadership style and was opposed to the intrusion of the State Security Council system into virtually every facet of government. After I became leader of the National Party in February 1989, I did my best to ensure that P. W. Botha would be able to end his term as president with full dignity and decorum. Unfortunately, this was not to be."

== Apartheid government ==
Botha undertook some changes to apartheid practices, but these were rejected by many as superficial and inadequate. He legalised interracial marriage and miscegenation, both completely banned since the late 1940s. The constitutional prohibition on multiracial political parties was lifted. He also relaxed the Group Areas Act, which barred non-whites from living in certain areas. In 1988, a new law created "Open Group Areas" or racially mixed neighbourhoods but these neighbourhoods had to receive a Government permit, had to have the support of the local whites immediately concerned, and had to be an upper-class neighbourhood in a major city in order to be awarded a permit. In 1983, the aforementioned constitutional reforms granted limited political rights to "Coloureds" and "Indians". Botha also became the first South African government leader to authorise contacts with Nelson Mandela, the imprisoned leader of the African National Congress (ANC).

Even these meagre reforms went too far for a group of NP hardliners, led by former Education Minister Andries Treurnicht. In 1982, the group broke away to form the Conservative Party. However, they did not even begin to meet the demands of the opposition. In the face of rising discontent and violence, Botha refused to cede political power to blacks and imposed greater security measures against anti-apartheid activists. Botha also refused to negotiate with the ANC.

In 1985, Botha delivered the Rubicon speech, a policy address in which he refused to give in to demands by the black population, including the release of Mandela. Botha's defiance of international opinion further isolated South Africa, leading to economic sanctions and a rapid decline in the value of the rand. The following year, when the United States introduced the Comprehensive Anti-Apartheid Act, Botha declared a nationwide state of emergency. He is famously quoted during this time as saying, "This uprising will bring out the beast in us".

As economic and diplomatic actions against South Africa increased, civil unrest spread amongst the black population, supported by the ANC and neighbouring black-majority governments. On 16 May 1986, Botha publicly warned neighbouring states against engaging in "unsolicited interference" in South Africa's affairs. Four days later, Botha ordered air strikes against selected targets in Lusaka, Harare, and Gaborone, including the offices of exiled ANC activists. Botha charged that these raids were just a "first installment" and showed that "South Africa has the capacity and the will to break the [ANC]."

In spite of the concessions made by Botha, his rule was still very repressive. Thousands were detained without trial during Botha's tenure, while others were tortured and killed. The TRC found Botha responsible for gross violations of human rights. He was also found to have directly authorised "unlawful activity which included killing." Botha declined to apologise for apartheid. In a 2006 interview to mark his 90th birthday, he suggested that he had no regrets about the way he had run the country. Botha denied that he had ever considered black South Africans to be in any way inferior to whites, but conceded that "some" whites did hold that view. He also claimed that the racial segregation laws of apartheid "started in Lord Milner's time" and the National Party merely inherited them; however, Botha conceded that the Afrikaner population had been "happy to perpetuate [apartheid]", as many of them "were, and some of them still are... 'racists at heart'".

Nelson Mandela was a planned target of Project Coast with the intention to poison him with toxic agents to damage his mental capacities whilst he was incarcerated during the Botha regime. According to later witnesses during the trial of Dr. Wouter Basson in 2002, the initial plan was to poison Mandela with thallium shortly before his release in 1990.

== Post-presidency ==
Botha and his wife Elize retired to their home, Die Anker, in the town of Wilderness, 16 kilometres (9.9 mi) from the city of George and located on the Indian Ocean coast of the Western Cape. Elize died in 1997 after a heart attack. He was briefly engaged to Reinette Water Naude, an independently wealthy woman 31 years his junior. However, on 22 June 1998, he married Barbara Robertson, a legal secretary 25 years his junior.

Botha remained largely out of sight of the media and it was widely believed that he remained opposed to many of F. W. de Klerk's reforms. He resigned from the Afrikaner Broederbond.

Then-president Nelson Mandela arranged a dinner with Botha's daughters, Rozanne and Elsa, and their husbands. Mandela had hoped to lobby the family so that they would persuade Botha to testify at the new government's Truth and Reconciliation Commission (TRC), set up to expose apartheid-era crimes and chaired by his cultural and political nemesis, Archbishop Desmond Tutu. There was no unanimous agreement between the family, with Rozanne vocally opposed, believing that her father could face prosecution and/or humiliation in the court. The TRC found that he had ordered the 1988 bombing of the South African Council of Churches headquarters in Johannesburg. In August 1998, he was fined and given a suspended jail sentence for his refusal to testify on human rights violations and violence sanctioned by the State Security Council (SSC) which he, as president until 1989, had directed.

In June 1999, Botha successfully appealed to the High Court against his conviction and sentence. The Court's ruling by Judge Selikowitz (with Judge Foxcroft concurring) found that the notice served on Botha to appear before the TRC was technically invalid.

=== Death and funeral ===
Botha died of natural causes (Note: Though some sources claim Botha died of a heart attack, many reliable sources report he died of natural causes.) at his home in Wilderness on Tuesday 31 October 2006, aged 90. His death was met with magnanimity by many of his former opponents. Former President Nelson Mandela was reported as saying "while to many Mr. Botha will remain a symbol of apartheid, we also remember him for the steps he took to pave the way towards the eventual peacefully negotiated settlement in our country".

President Thabo Mbeki announced that flags would be flown at half mast to mark the death of a former head of state. The offer of a state funeral was declined by Botha's family, and a private funeral was held on 8 November in the town of George, where Botha's body was buried. Mbeki attended the funeral.

The government's decision to honour Botha with official gestures, such as flying the national flag at half-mast and offering a state funeral, was met with public criticism. Organisations including the Pan Africanist Congress (PAC) and COSATU expressed strong opposition, arguing that a man widely regarded as a symbol of apartheid oppression should not receive national recognition.

== Honours and awards ==
=== National honours ===
- Decoration for Meritorious Services, May 1976
- Grand Cross of the Order of the Star of South Africa, November 1979

=== Foreign honours ===
Ribbon	Distinction	Country	Date	Reference
	Grand Cross of the Military Order of Christ	Portugal	8 April 1967	
	Order of Propitious Clouds with Special Grand Cordon	Republic of China	October 1980	

== Notes ==
Political offices
Preceded by Jim Fouché	Minister of Defence; 1966–1980	Succeeded by Magnus Malan
Preceded by B. J. Vorster	Prime Minister of South Africa; 1978–1984	Position abolished
Preceded by Marais Viljoen	State President of South Africa; 1984–1989	Succeeded by F. W. de Klerk
