= Raymond Suttner =

South African activist and journalist

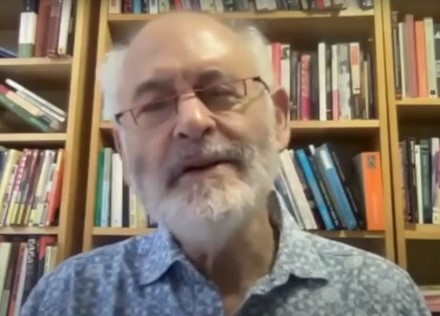
- Suttner (2022)
- Born: 29 August 1945 (age 81); Durban, Natal Province, South Africa
- Education: University of Cape Town; University of the Witwatersrand
- Known for: Activist; academic; journalist
- Scientific career
- Workplaces: Rhodes University
- Website: raymondsuttner.com

Raymond Suttner (born 29 August 1945) is a South African activist, academic, journalist and public figure.

== Education and activism ==
Suttner was born in Durban, South Africa. He obtained BA and LLB degrees from the University of Cape Town and an inter-disciplinary doctorate (history, sociology and political studies) from the University of the Witwatersrand in Johannesburg.

During the struggle against apartheid Suttner was in the leadership of the African National Congress (ANC), South African Communist Party and the United Democratic Front.

He served two prison terms under apartheid. He was sentenced to seven and a half years in 1975 for "taking part in the activities of an unlawful organisation" by distributing ANC literature, and "undergoing training or inciting or encouraging others to undergo training, or obtaining information which could be of use in furthering the achievements of any of the objects of communism or any unlawful organisation". He served his sentence in Pretoria Local, or Pretoria Prison, which was part of the Pretoria Central Prison complex, along with Denis Goldberg, Jeremy Cronin and others. He was there at the time of a daring escape in 1979 by Tim Jenkin, Stephen Lee and Alex Moumbaris.

== Academic affiliations ==
He currently has academic affiliations at Rhodes University, the University of South Africa and the University of the Witwatersrand.

== Personal life ==
Suttner was married to the academic, writer and activist Nomboniso Gasa.. They divorced in early 2021.

== Publications ==
- Raymond Suttner; Jeremy Cronin (1985). 30 Years of the Freedom Charter. Johannesburg: Ravan Press. ISBN 978-1-876175-25-2.
- Raymond Suttner; Jeremy Cronin (2006). 50 years of the Freedom Charter. Unisa Press. ISBN 978-1-86888-375-2.
- Raymond Suttner (2002). Inside Apartheid's Prison: Notes and letters of struggle. Minneapolis: Ocean Press. ISBN 978-1-876175-25-2.
- The ANC Underground in South Africa. Johannesburg: Jacana Press. 2008. ISBN 978-1-77009-597-7.
- Recovering Democracy in South Africa. Johannesburg: Jacana Press. 2015. ISBN 978-1-4314-2158-9.
- Raymond Suttner (1984). The Freedom Charter: the people's charter in the nineteen-eighties. University of Cape Town. ISBN 978-0-7992-0927-3.
- Raymond Suttner (2003). The Character and Formation of Intellectuals Within the South African Liberation Movement. Codesria.
