= Denis Goldberg =

South African anti-apartheid activist (1933–2020)

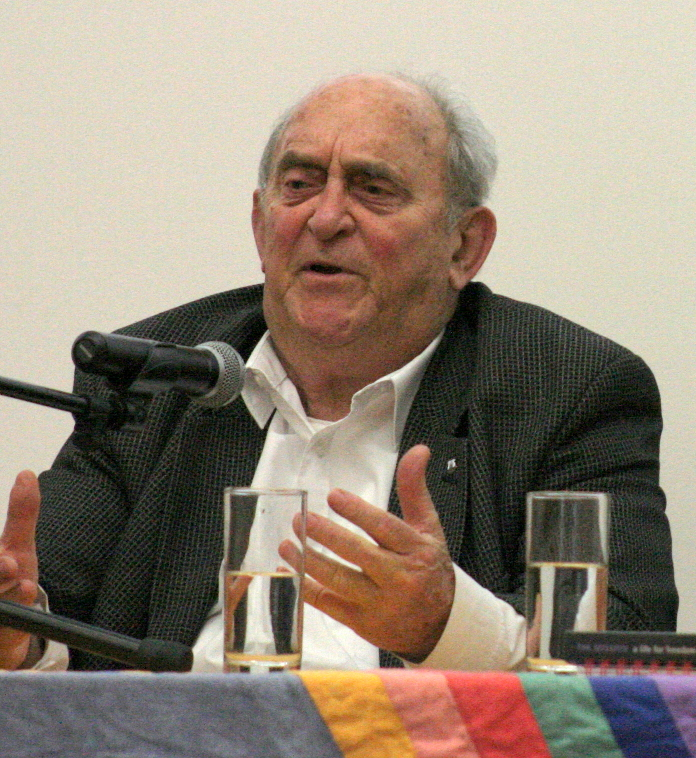
- Denis Goldberg speaking at the launch of the Edinburgh World Justice Festival, 12 October 2013
- Born: Denis Theodore Goldberg; 11 April 1933; Cape Town, Cape Province, Union of South Africa
- Died: 29 April 2020 (aged 87); Cape Town, Western Cape, South Africa
- Education: University of Cape Town
- Known for: Rivonia Trial
- Political party: African National Congress
- Spouse(s): Esme Bodenstein (m. 1954; died 2000) Edelgard Nkobi (m. 2002; died 2006)
- Children: Hilary Goldberg (daughter, died 2002); David Goldberg (son)
- Relatives: Madeleine Hicklin (niece)

Denis Theodore Goldberg (11 April 1933 – 29 April 2020) was a South African social campaigner who was active in the struggle against apartheid. He was accused No. 3 of 11 defendants in the Rivonia Trial of 1964, alongside the better-known Nelson Mandela and Walter Sisulu. He was the youngest of the defendants.

He was convicted and imprisoned for 22 years, along with other key members of the anti-apartheid movement in South Africa. After his release in 1985, he continued to campaign against apartheid from his base in London with his family. The apartheid system was fully abolished with the 1994 election.

He returned to South Africa in 2002 and founded the non-profit Denis Goldberg Legacy Foundation Trust in 2015. He was diagnosed with lung cancer in July 2017, and died in Cape Town on 29 April 2020.

== Biography ==
=== Early life ===
Denis Theodore Goldberg was born on 11 April 1933 in Cape Town, South Africa and grew up in a family that welcomed people of all races into their house. He was the son of Annie (Fineberg), a seamstress, and Sam Goldberg, a truck driver. His parents were born in London, the children of Lithuanian Jews who had emigrated to England in the latter half of the 19th century. Both parents were politically active communists while living in London. After moving to Cape Town, they played an active role in the local Woodstock Branch of the South African Communist Party. Sam supported the family with a series of small businesses.

In March 1950, at age 16, Goldberg began his studies in civil engineering at the University of Cape Town. In his final year he met Esme Bodenstein, who also came from a family active in the Communist Party. They married in January 1954. Their daughter Hilary was born in 1955 and their son David in 1957.

=== Anti-apartheid activism in South Africa ===
==== Modern Youth Society ====
Bodenstein was a committee member of the multiracial Modern Youth Society (MYS), through which Goldberg became friends with Andimba Toivo Ya Toivo. The latter man later co-founded SWAPO (South West African People’s Organisation) and, after Namibian independence, became one of its leaders. (Note: Later, in 1957 Chief Hosea Kutako, leader of the Herero people in South West Africa (now Namibia), was refused permission by the South African authorities to represent his people at the United Nations. In response Goldberg assisted Ya Toivo to make a tape-recorded message and post it to New York, where Mburumba Kerina brought it the attention of the U.N. The South African authorities declared Ya Toivo to be an illegal immigrant and expelled him to the northern part of the country.) The MYS aimed to raise awareness and solidarity by various means, including selling the "New Age" newspaper, canvassing door-to-door, and holding night classes to educate and politicise working people. The Goldbergs also became involved in the Congress of Democrats. Although these activities were not illegal, the couple and other activists were constantly harassed by the Security Police, who were building up dossiers on those involved.

==== 1955: Congress of the People ====
In 1953 prominent black academic Z. K. Matthews proposed that a "Congress of the People" be organised to gather and document the wishes of the people. Organising committees were set up across South Africa, and Goldberg joined the Cape Town committee. Tasked with organising residents of the desperately poor Loyolo informal settlement in Simonstown, he visited Loyolo every weekend to help the community elect their delegate. After being spotted there by Security Police, he was fired from his job on the South African Railways.

The Western Cape delegates were stopped by the Security Police and held in jail to prevent them attending the Congress of the People in Kliptown. But on 25–26 June 1955, 3,000 delegates gathered there and adopted the Freedom Charter. This movement led to the formation of the Congress Alliance, bringing together an alliance of four racially-based anti-apartheid political movements: the African National Congress (ANC), the Congress of Democrats (COD), the South African Indian Congress (SAIC) and Coloured Peoples Congress (CPC), into one large multi-racial movement, sometimes called the Charterists.

==== 1960: first prison experience ====
In 1957 Goldberg joined the Communist Party (which had been banned in 1950). He was arrested on 30 March 1960 for supporting strikers in the townships in the aftermath of the Sharpeville massacre on 21 March 1960. Along with his mother, he spent four months in prison without trial. He subsequently lost his job working on the construction of the Athlone Power Station, which added to the burden placed on Esme to support the family. Faced with similar circumstances, several comrades left the country.

==== 1961–1963: armed resistance ====
With the government using increasingly violent methods to suppress peaceful protests, Goldberg and others argued for an armed struggle against the police and military. After the underground armed wing, Umkhonto we Sizwe ("Spear of the Nation", or MK) was founded as an armed wing of the ANC in December 1961, Goldberg became a technical officer. The aim was to act only against hard targets, such as power pylons and avoid any injury or loss of life.

Together with Looksmart Ngudle, Goldberg helped organise a training camp at Mamre, outside Cape Town, in December 1962. The camp was later recognised as the first MK training centre inside South Africa; however it had to be abandoned early due to Security Police interest. Goldberg was later charged for his involvement in the camp and other activities at the Rivonia Trial.

Following a wave of sabotage attacks, the government passed two pieces of legislation. The 90-Day Detention Law of 1963 allowed the Security Police to detain a person for 90 days without charging them or allowing access to a lawyer, and the Sabotage Act of 1962 shifted the onus of proof, requiring the accused to prove their innocence. MK decided that Goldberg needed to leave the country to be trained elsewhere for a while, but first he had to travel to Johannesburg to obtain clearance from the MK High Command.

In Johannesburg Goldberg helped in the radio broadcast of a speech on 26 June Freedom Day by Walter Sisulu, who was out on bail at the time. This was to show people that the ANC was still active despite government repression. Lionel Gay, a lecturer in physics at Witwatersrand University, built the radio transmitter.

=== Arrest and imprisonment ===
==== July 1963: arrest at Liliesleaf ====
On 11 July 1963, the security police raided Liliesleaf farmhouse in Rivonia in the northern suburbs of Johannesburg. Activists intended that day to hold the last meeting there, after they had been using the house as a secret site for nearly two years. Goldberg was arrested at the farm along with several others, including Walter Sisulu, Govan Mbeki, Raymond Mhlaba and Rusty Bernstein.

Goldberg was subjected to a series of often aggressive interrogations, sometimes threatened with hanging and at other times offered inducements to turn state witness. He was told that his friend, Looksmart Ngudle, had died in prison. Esme had also been arrested and was held under the 90-day Detention Law for 38 days, during which she was treated harshly and subjected to threats to have her children removed from her.

On 8 October 1963, after the 90-day detention period had expired, Goldberg and the other activists were charged with offences under the Sabotage Act. (Nelson Mandela was in prison at the time of the raid, but documents found at Liliesleaf enabled the State to add him as a co-accused.) The subsequent trial became known as the Rivonia Trial.

==== 1963–1964: the Rivonia Trial ====
The day after being charged, Goldberg and his co-accused met with their lawyers – Bram Fischer, Joel Joffe, Arthur Chaskalson and George Bizos – who told them that their situation was dire and that death by hanging was the likely outcome. Goldberg, in an effort to protect Mandela and the other leaders, offered to take responsibility by saying that he had exceeded his instructions in regard to weapons manufacture, arguing that the evidence against him was the most difficult to refute given that the plans had clearly been written by him. This offer was dismissed by the others. An escape plan was discussed, and Goldberg insisted that Esme and the children go into exile, for fear of repercussions should he be successful. Esme and the children left for Britain in December 1963, but Goldberg was unable to escape.

After two of the accused had escaped, the verdict was delivered on 12 June 1964: Bernstein was acquitted and Bob Hepple was discharged; the rest were all found guilty. The judge declined to impose the death sentence; instead eight of those convicted were sentenced to four terms of life imprisonment each. At 31 years old, Goldberg was the youngest of those sentenced and the only white man. His mother, who was in the court for sentencing, did not hear the judge, and shouted “Denis, what is it? What did the judge say?", to which Goldberg responded: “Life, and life is wonderful”.

==== June 1964: Pretoria Central Prison ====
Goldberg was sent to the Whites section of Pretoria Central Prison, while the others were sent to Robben Island. Like the others, he did not appeal his sentence. He was mostly alone in his cell for 16 to 18 hours a day. Prisoners were forbidden to talk amongst themselves and the harsh conditions often led to illness and psychological stress.

After four years, Esme was allowed to visit for the first time, but restricted to five half-hour visits. After another four years she was again allowed to visit, but after that never again, with no explanation given. After eight years, his children were allowed to visit, but again with severe restrictions.

In the first period, only one 500-word letter was permitted every six months but even these were often arbitrarily censored and cut. Over time the permitted number of letters was increased, but the word limit remained, as did the threat of censorship. On his release, Goldberg was given a pack of letters sent by Esme that had been withheld. At the time he had been told they had never arrived. While he was in prison and subsequently, Esme's house in East Finchley in north London provided a haven for many South African political refugees and various other itinerants.

Both of Goldberg's parents died while he was in prison. They had separated and his mother, Annie, had gone to live with Esme and the children in the UK. His father, Sam, remained in South Africa so as to be able to visit Denis. When Sam died, Goldberg was not permitted to attend the funeral. On the day before he was released, Goldberg was allowed, under guard, to visit his father’s grave.

Bram Fischer had led the legal team at the Rivonia Trial. In 1966 he joined Goldberg in prison after being given a life sentence for furthering the aims of communism and conspiracy to overthrow the government. When Fischer became very ill in 1974, Goldberg kept a detailed diary of his medical care. The diary was subsequently smuggled out of prison. After a fall, Fischer was belatedly diagnosed with terminal cancer. Goldberg helped care for him and managed to persuade the prison guards to let him stay with Fischer in his cell overnight. Non-political prisoners rarely served their full term, whereas political prisoners were required to serve every day of their sentence. Only shortly before his death was Fischer allowed to leave the prison, to be put under house arrest at his brother's house in Bloemfontein. A birthday telegram arranged by Goldberg on behalf of the prisoners was not only intercepted, but a prison officer told Goldberg that he would charge him for communicating with a prisoner without permission.

Political prisoners were cut off from all news of the outside world, to the extent that an article about the United States Bicentennial was cut from the Reader’s Digest before the magazine was given to the prisoners. In 1977 Goldberg, along with eight fellow-prisoners, brought a case against the Minister of Prisons and Commissioner of Prisons, asking to be entitled to receive newspapers, arguing that they were treated more harshly than other prisoners and the deprivation of news of any kind was an additional punishment to loss of liberty. The case was first heard in the Supreme Court of the Transvaal, with the judgement finding in favour of the State. The case was taken on appeal to the Supreme Court of Appeal, where it was found that while the commissioner did have sole discretion to determine how prisoners may be treated, the court may "entertain grave doubts as to the wisdom or reasonableness of the determination". Following the judgement Justice John Wessels, accompanied by General Jan Roux, first deputy commissioner, visited the prison. In the presence of Goldberg, Wessels said he was sure that Roux would see to it that they got the newspapers and magazines of their choice. In September 1980, Goldberg was told he could order newspapers - 16 years after being sentenced, he and some of his fellow prisoners were able to have access to news when they reached a certain grade within the prison system.

===== 1979: escape for some =====
In June 1978 Tim Jenkin and Stephen Lee, who had been sentenced to 12 years for illegal political activities, arrived at the prison. Shortly after arrival, Jenkin told Goldberg that he planned to escape, and asked for his help in hiding money that he had smuggled in. Various versions of the escape plan evolved over time, with the size of the escape group growing to a maximum of eight, including Goldberg, at one point.

Goldberg realised that an escape would come with a cost to the movement as it would provoke a severe clampdown by the authorities. For this reason, and to secure help with the logistics of the escape, he had to communicate with his comrades in the ANC. He was able to do this through coded letters sent to Baruch Hirson in London, with whom he had served a nine-year sentence, as between them they had created a code by which to communicate. Hirson then communicated with Joe Slovo in Mozambique, arranging an escape vehicle and other details.

As the plan evolved it became clear that, for the escape to be successful, it would have to be restricted to three people, as the final plan was dependent upon hiding for a while in a tiny closet in which only three slim people could fit. The escape preparations brought some differences of opinion amongst the political prisoners, who included David Rabkin, Jeremy Cronin and Raymond Suttner, but they remained comrades and all contributed in some way to the escape effort. Goldberg withdrew from the actual escape, leaving the three who had done most of the planning and had been the main drivers of the idea from the start: Jenkin, Lee and Alex Moumbaris. Goldberg helped to distract the warden while the three escapees made their way out; all three managed to escape to neighbouring countries and freedom.

===== 1985: a negotiated release =====
Goldberg's daughter Hilary was living in Kibbutz Ma'ayan Baruch in northern Israel, among whose founders in 1947 were Jewish soldiers from South Africa who fought in the British Army during World War II and knew Denis from South Africa. Together with the kibbutz management, Hilary had set up a committee to try and obtain her father’s release from prison. Herut Lapid, who campaigned for the release of Jewish prisoners worldwide, became involved and started lobbying political contacts in Britain. It was a difficult time for Goldberg as he did not know the stance of the ANC and his comrades imprisoned on Robben Island towards his possible release. Isolated as he was from both of them and those at liberty there was little opportunity for consultation; however, a message was conveyed to him that the ANC, including those on Robben Island, approved of the initiatives of his daughter and Herut Lapid.

In 1985, these ongoing initiatives were complemented by political developments. Under pressure from the United States, the government offered to release political prisoners if they renounced violence. Goldberg asked to see Mandela and his other comrades in Cape Town, but this was refused. The main condition put to Goldberg was that he would not take part in violence for political ends. Goldberg agreed not to be a soldier anymore, but he did not repudiate his earlier involvement or the need for an armed struggle. In a letter to President P. W. Botha he detailed his position and agreed to an "undertaking to participate in normal peaceful politics which can be freely and meaningfully practised". On 28 February 1985, after 22 years in prison, he was released.

While in prison, Goldberg had attained degrees in Public Administration, History and Geography, and in Library Science through the University of South Africa and had undertaken part of a law degree.

=== 1985–2002: freedom and exile in London ===
Goldberg was taken straight from prison to the airport to fly to Israel, where he was reunited with his wife and children.

Goldberg went into exile in London with his family and resumed his work in the ANC at its London office. On 26 June 1985, on the 30th anniversary of the Congress of the People (aka Freedom Day), as spokesperson for the ANC, he gave a speech at Trafalgar Square at an Anti-Apartheid Movement (AAM) rally, also attended by leader of the British Labour Party, Neil Kinnock, and that December went on a six-week speaking tour in Scandinavia. He represented the movement at the Anti-Apartheid Committee of the United Nations and also became involved in Woodcraft Folk, a British civic movement for young people in which his family had been active for many years. His main role through the years until 1994 was to build support for the AAM, and to this end he travelled extensively across Europe and North America, doing speaking engagements and media interviews. He also established strong relationships with trade unions and long-standing relationships with people who continued to support South Africa after democracy was established.

==== 1994: apartheid ends ====
After the first non-racial elections in South Africa and the inauguration of Nelson Mandela as president in 1994, Goldberg decided not to return to South Africa, primarily so he could remain with Esme, his children, and grandchildren, who wanted to stay in the UK.

Goldberg was involved in the early days of Computer Aid International (founded in 1996), and became their honorary patron. He founded the development organisation Community HEART in London in 1995, to help to improve the living standards of black South Africans. Community HEART raised funds for organisations such as Rape Crisis Cape Town, as well as for initiatives to provide books and computers to schools. With the support of German friends he established Community HEART eV in Essen in Germany in 1996, where he met Edelgard Nkobi. He subsequently visited Germany many times, learning to speak German and establishing a wide network of friends.

In 2000 Esme died after emergency surgery to treat a gangrenous bowel. In 2002 Goldberg and Nkobi married in London; just days later, his daughter Hilary died suddenly, as Goldberg and Nkobi were preparing to return to South Africa.

=== 2002: return to South Africa ===
Goldberg returned to South Africa in 2002 and was appointed Special Adviser to Ronnie Kasrils MP, Minister of Water Affairs and Forestry until 2004. He subsequently served as special advisor to Buyelwa Sonjica, successor to Kasrils.

Goldberg and Nkobi lived initially in Pretoria, then in Cape Town. Nkobi died in 2006 after a long battle with cancer.

== Later life, death and legacy ==
Goldberg continued to travel to Germany and other countries to speak about South Africa and the work needed to transform it; in June 2009 he presented a paper titled “South Africa, the Transition to Democracy and the Banning of Torture” at a seminar at the University of Düsseldorf.

In 2009 Goldberg received the Order of Luthuli for his contribution to the liberation struggle and his service to the South African people.

In 2010 he published his autobiography, The Mission: A Life for Freedom in South Africa (a new edition was published in 2016).

In his later years, Goldberg was a supporter of the Boycott, Divestment, and Sanctions (BDS) movement against Israel. He viewed Israel's treatment of the Palestinians as being akin to apartheid-era South Africa.

Goldberg became involved in a project to teach high school students about the history of the liberation struggle and also lent support to several projects in Hout Bay, the Cape Town suburb where he lived. This included support to the Kronendal Music Academy (founded 2007) which aims to bring together young people from different communities through playing music. He used his German contacts to help arrange for a jazz band composed of Kronendal students to tour Germany in 2012.

Like many struggle veterans, Goldberg criticised corruption in the ANC. Appearing on BBC Radio 5 Live in January 2016 he said "the members of the ANC need to renew the leadership from top to bottom".

On 23 January 2019, Deputy ANC President David Mabuza awarded Goldberg the party's highest honour, Isitwalandwe.

In July 2017, Goldberg was diagnosed with stage 4 lung cancer after collapsing during a speaking tour in Germany. After extensive chemotherapy his tumour shrank; however, his cancer subsequently returned.

=== Death ===
Goldberg died at his home in Hout Bay just before midnight on 29 April 2020. Goldberg's death was followed by the death of Andrew Mlangeni, who died on 21 July same year; they were both last two surviving Rivonia Trialists.

President Cyril Ramaphosa paid his respects, and stated that: "His commitment to ethical leadership was unflinching and even during his advanced age, he formed part of the movement of veterans of the struggle calling for the reassertion of the moral center of society. He dedicated his life to achieving the better life we enjoy today and his revolutionary contribution reinforced the non-racial character of our struggle and of our democratic dispensation". The National Coronavirus Command Council observed a moment’s silence in his honour.

=== Denis Goldberg House of Hope ===
In 2015, Goldberg and four others established the non-profit Denis Goldberg Legacy Foundation Trust. The primary focus of the Trust was the establishment of an arts, cultural and educational centre, to be known as the Denis Goldberg House of Hope. Despite suffering from lung cancer, at the age of 85 he continued to work on the project. In an interview in the 2018 UCT Alumni Magazine, Goldberg spoke of his passion for the project and belief in the role of art and culture to promote change, saying that South Africa was still a very divided society and that young people needed "to sing together, dance together, make poetry together".

The Denis Goldberg House of Hope Arts and Culture Education Centre) was officially opened on 9 April 2022. It is situated on the site of the Hout Bay Museum, and houses the Goldberg art collection, titled “Life is Wonderful”, an exhibition of Goldberg's life, and other memorabilia. The centre also offers a variety of regular afternoon and Saturday morning sessions for children in, among others, circus skills, drama, art, music, movement and hip hop.)

== Awards and recognition ==
- 1988 Albert J Luthuli African Peace Award by a group of 12 US organisations: American Friends Service Committee, American Red Cross and others
- 2000 Honorary doctorate from the Medical University of South Africa (now Sefako Makgatho Health Sciences University)
- 2009 Order of Luthuli (Silver) by president of South Africa
- 2010-11 Order of Merit of the Federal Republic of Germany (Verdienstkreuz am Bande) (Note: Not on the list shown here for 2010 though.)
- 2012 Military Veterans Medal (Platinum Class II) Mahatma Gandhi Satyagraha Peace Award by Gandhi Development Trust, Durban
- 2012 Randburg Ward 102 branch of the ANC named Denis Goldberg Branch
- 2012 World Scholar award from City of Glasgow College
- 2018 Honorary doctorate from Heriot-Watt University, Scotland
- 2019 Isitwalandwe Medal
- 2019 Honorary doctorate from the University of Cape Town

== Works ==
- Goldberg, Denis (2010). The Mission : A Life for Freedom in South Africa. Johannesburg: STE. OCLC 723667119.
- Goldberg, Denis (2012). Mandela-Tambo : friends, comrades, leaders, legacy. Mandela-Tambo lecture series, 4. ISBN 9780955653834. OCLC 870178125. "This paper was delivered as the Fourth lecture of the Mandela-Tambo lecture series, 13 September 2012. The lecture was organised by the City of Glasgow College and ACTSA Scotland in association with the SA High Commission. The Glasgow Mandela-Tambo lecture 2011."
- Goldberg, Denis (2016). A Life for Freedom: The Mission to End Racial Injustice in South Africa. University Press of Kentucky. ISBN 9780813166858. (First 7 chapters available online)

== Film and TV ==
In 2013, the story of the prison escape was dramatised in the 7th episode of the 2nd season of Breakout, a television series made by National Geographic TV channel dramatising real-life prison escapes. The video features excerpts from interviews with Jenkin, Lee, Moumbaris and Goldberg filmed in 2012, in between re-enacted scenes of the prison escape.

In 2017 Goldberg appeared along with remaining surviving co-defendants at the Rivonia Trial, Andrew Mlangeni and Ahmed Kathrada, along with lawyers Joel Joffe, George Bizos and Denis Kuny in a documentary film entitled Life is Wonderful, directed by Sir Nicholas Stadlen, which tells the story of the trial. The title reflects Goldberg's words to his mother at the end of the trial on hearing that he and his comrades had been spared the death sentence and Sir Nicholas said that he was inspired to make the film after spending a day with Goldberg.

Announced in 2017, a film of Tim Jenkin's book about his escape from Pretoria Central Prison, produced by David Barron and starring Daniel Radcliffe as Jenkin started production in 2018. It was originally announced that Sam Neill would play Goldberg, but when production time arrived, Ian Hart assumed the role. Filming of Escape from Pretoria began in Adelaide, South Australia, in March 2019. The film was released in March 2020, a month before his death.
