= Alfred Baphethuxolo Nzo =

South African politician

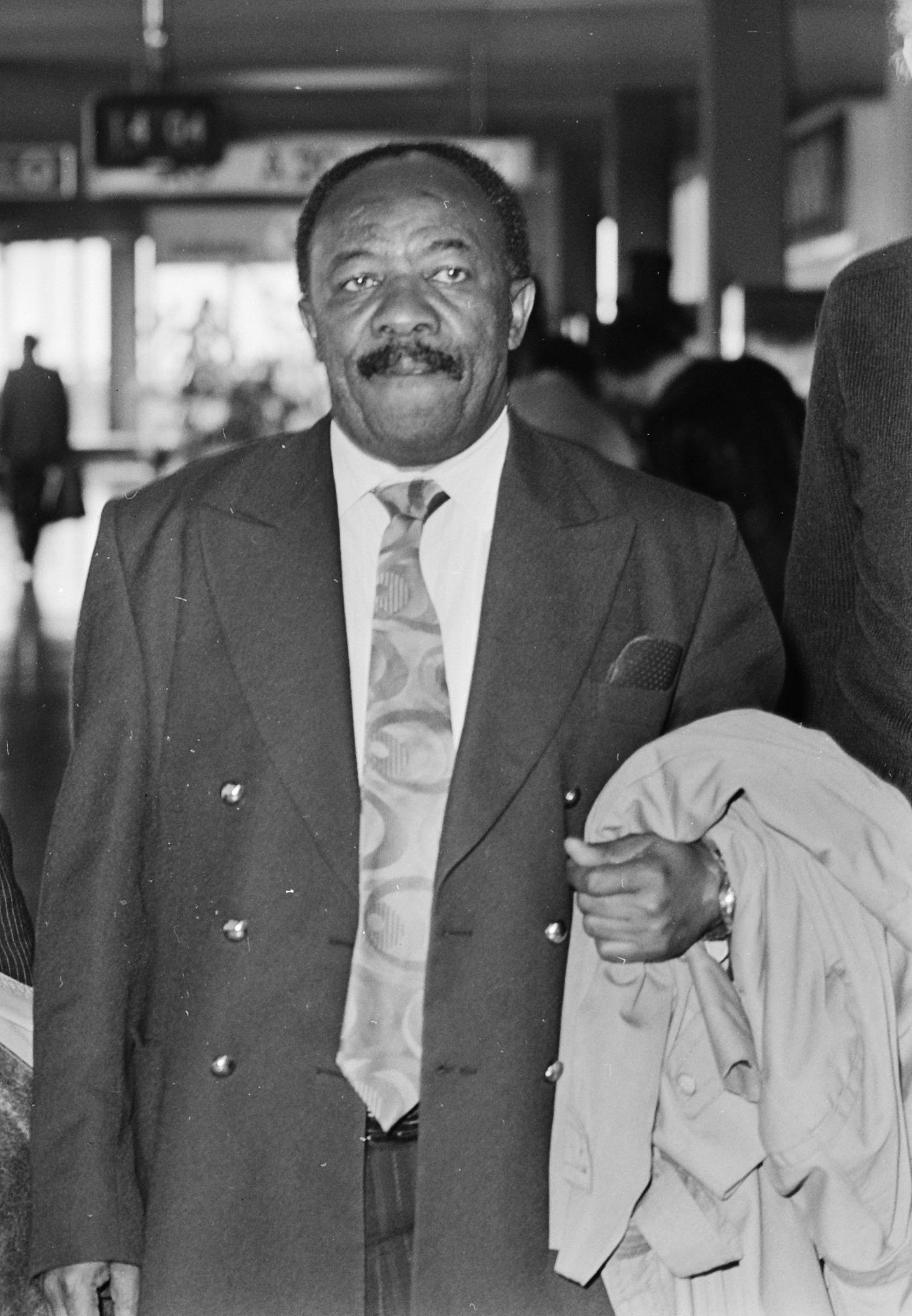
- Nzo in 1977

Minister of Foreign Affairs
- In office 10 May 1994 – 14 June 1999
- President: Nelson Mandela
- Preceded by: Pik Botha
- Succeeded by: Nkosazana Dlamini-Zuma

12th Secretary-General of the African National Congress
- In office 1969 – 7 July 1991
- President: Oliver Tambo
- Preceded by: Duma Nokwe
- Succeeded by: Cyril Ramaphosa

Personal details
- Born: 19 June 1925 Benoni, South Africa
- Died: 13 January 2000 (aged 74) Johannesburg, South Africa
- Resting place: Westpark Cemetery
- Party: African National Congress
- Spouse: Regina Nzo
- Education: University of Fort Hare (BSc)
- Occupation: Politician; activist

Alfred Baphethuxolo Nzo (19 June 1925 – 13 January 2000) was a South African politician. He served as the longest-standing secretary-general of the African National Congress. He occupied this position (ANC) between 1969 and 1991. He was also the South African minister of foreign affairs from 1994 to 1999. He was also the first black health inspector in the country. The Alfred Nzo Award is now awarded to deserving health practitioners in South Africa.

== Political career ==
He was sent off to the Eastern Cape to receive missionary education. After completing his matric, he enrolled for BSc degree at University of Fort Hare in 1945. At Fort Hare he joined the African National Congress (ANC) Youth League and became actively involved in students politics. In his second year of study he left university and started work as health inspector at KwaDukathole in Germiston and was later transferred to the Alexandra health and community centre in 1951.

As health inspector, Nzo developed much understanding of the lives of millions of South Africans in the 1950s. He got actively involved in the organising of the Defiance Campaign in 1952. He was also involved in the campaign to interview people about the kind of society in which they would like to live. It was this campaign that culminated in the Congress of the People in 1955, at which the Freedom Charter was adopted.

In 1956 Nzo was elected the chairperson of ANC branch in Alexandra. In 1957 he organised the Alexandra bus boycotts in which people walked nine miles from the township to the city (Johannesburg) and back every day for three months to protest the increase in fares. His involvement in political activities cost him his job. His expulsion from work meant that he also lost his residential permit to live in Alexandra. He was subsequently arrested several times and finally sentenced to five months' imprisonment for not having a residence permit. He served his sentence at Modderbee Prison, where his father once worked.

In 1958, Nzo was elected to the regional and national executive committees of the ANC. In 1962, he was placed under 24-hour house arrest and in June 1963 detained for a period of 238 days. The following year, Nzo went into exile and took up posts in various countries including Egypt, India, Zambia and Tanzania.

In 1969, Nzo was elected ANC Secretary-General at the Morogoro Conference in Tanzania, and re-elected to this position at the Kwabe Conference in 1985.

On 30 December 1979 he and Oliver Tambo met Tim Jenkin, Stephen Lee and Alex Moumbaris, ANC members and escapees from incarceration at Pretoria Central Prison as political prisoners. Their presence was officially announced by the ANC in early January and Tambo introduced them at a press conference on 2 January 1980.

After the unbanning of the liberation movements in 1990, Nzo formed part of the ANC delegation that entered into deliberations with the National Party government. Nzo lost the position of Secretary-General to Cyril Ramaphosa at the ANC July 1991 National Conference held in South Africa for the first time after the unbanning of the liberation movements. He was then elected deputy head of the ANC's security department. After the first democratic elections in 1994, Nzo was appointed Minister of Foreign Affairs in the government of Nelson Mandela.

After the 1999 national elections, Nzo retired from politics and in December of the same year he died of a stroke and he was survived by his wife Regina Nzo who died on 27 September 2011 at the age of 81 years old. He was buried at the Westpark Cemetery in Johannesburg.

== See also ==
- Alfred Nzo District Municipality

Political offices
Preceded by Pik Botha	Minister of Foreign Affairs; 1994–1999	Succeeded by Nkosazana Dlamini-Zuma
