= Jeremy Cronin =

South African politician (born 1949)

Jeremy Patrick Cronin

Deputy Minister of Public Works
- In office 12 June 2012 – June 2019
- President: Cyril Ramaphosa

Deputy Minister of Transport
- In office 11 May 2009 – 12 June 2012
- President: Jacob Zuma
- Succeeded by: Lydia Sindiswe Chikunga

Personal details
- Born: 12 September 1949 (age 76)
- Party: South African Communist Party
- Other political affiliations: African National Congress
- Education: University of Cape Town (BA); Sorbonne University (MA)

Jeremy Patrick Cronin (born 12 September 1949) is a South African writer, author, and noted poet. A longtime activist in politics, Cronin is a member of the South African Communist Party and a former member of the National Executive Committee of the African National Congress. He served as the South African Deputy Minister of Public Works from 2012 until his retirement in 2019.

== Early life ==
Cronin was brought up in a White middle-class Roman Catholic family in Rondebosch in Cape Town, South Africa. During adolescence, he considered the idea of entering the priesthood. After a year's military service, when he was conscripted in the South African Navy, Cronin won a bursary to study at the University of Cape Town in 1968; there he became a member of the Radical Student Society and was subsequently recruited into then-banned South African Communist Party (SACP).

In the early 1970s, Cronin studied for his Master's degree in Philosophy in France and returned to South Africa, where he began lecturing in the Philosophy department at the University of Cape Town.

== Activism and imprisonment ==
Cronin's work in the propaganda unit of the SACP brought him to the attention of the South African Bureau of State Security; he was arrested on charges under the Terrorism and Internal Security Acts and tried in the Cape Town Supreme Court in September 1976, along with David Rabkin and his wife Sue. The charges included conspiring with members of the African National Congress (also a banned organisation) and the SACP, and preparing and distributing pamphlets on these organisations' behalf (activities commemorated in Cronin's poem "A Step Away from Them," modelled on a poem of the same title by American poet Frank O'Hara). Cronin pleaded guilty to all charges and was sentenced to seven years' imprisonment (1976–1983). He served his time in Pretoria Local, or Pretoria Prison, which was part of the Pretoria Central Prison complex, along with Denis Goldberg, Raymond Suttner and others. He participated in the planning of a daring escape in 1979 by Tim Jenkin, Stephen Lee and Alex Moumbaris. His wife Anne Marie died of a brain tumour during his imprisonment.

== Poetry ==
Cronin's first book of poetry, Inside, was published in 1984 following his release from prison. Subsequent volumes include Even the Dead (1997) and Inside and Out (1999). His most recent collection, More Than A Casual Contact, was published in 2006. Among his best known poems is "Motho Ke Motho Ka Batho Babang", whose title is taken from the Sotho aphorism "A person is a person because of other people".

=== Poetry collections ===
- Inside (1984)
- Even the Dead: Poems, Parables and a Jeremiad (1997)
- Inside and Out (1999)
- More than a Casual Contact (2006)

== Politics ==
Following Cronin's release from prison he began working with the United Democratic Front (UDF), founded in 1983, where he worked as the editor of its theoretical journal Isizwe (The Nation). He was also involved in various kinds of popular education, but in the late 1980s, increased harassment from the security forces forced him and his wife to leave South Africa and move first to London, then to Lusaka in Zambia, where he worked closely with Joe Slovo for the ANC/SACP alliance. In the 1990s, he worked in the SACP head office in Johannesburg, where he was deputy general secretary of the party. He became a member of parliament in 1999. His interviews with Helena Sheehan in 2001 and 2002 met with a storm of controversy, because of his left critique of the ANC during the presidency of Thabo Mbeki. He was forced to apologise to the ANC in 2002. He delivered the Chris Hani memorial lecture, titled Why South Africa will never be like Zimbabwe, in Durban on 4 May 2008. On 10 May 2009, President Jacob Zuma appointed him Deputy Minister of Transport, and in 2012 he moved to become Deputy Minister of Public Works. In May 2019, he retired from parliament and government office.

== Political writings ==
- "The national democratic struggle and the question of transformation", 1986
- "Inside which circle, a reply to Colin Bundy, 1989
- "For the sake of our lives: Guidelines for the creation of people's self-defence units", 1991
- "The boat, the tap and the Leipzig way", 1992
- "Dreaming of final showdown – a reply to Jordan and Nzimande", 1992
- "A Mass-Driven Transformation", 1994
- "Challenging the neo-liberal agenda in South Africa", 1995
- "Tragic lessons of the Algerian Revolution", June 1995
- "A Patriotic Bourgeoisie?", May 1996
- "Masakhane and Socialism", November 1996
- "Let us build together", November 1996
- "Thinking about the Concept "National Democratic Revolution", 1996
- "We Need Transformation, Not A Balancing Act", 1997
- "The New Imperialism", May 1997
- "Labour Landslide and the Left", June 1997
- "More than ever – SACP perspective on the Alliance", December 1997
- "Communist Manifesto, 150 years", February 1998
- "Chris Hani", 1999
- "Transforming Legislatures into Tributes of the people", July 1999
- "Morality is relevant in economic policy", 2000
- "Review of The UDF- History of the United Democratic Front 1983–1991", 2000
- "Liberation movements, governance and bureaucratisation", November 2001
- "Post-Apartheid South Africa: A Reply to John S. Saul", December 2002
- "Here Comes The Sun – drawing lessons from Slovo's No Middle Road, January 2003
- "Preparations to celebrate the first decade of freedom, June 26 2003
- "Contemporary challenge for left progressive forces in Africa and Europe", September 2003
- "Living in Joe Slovo", 11 July 2005
- "Neo-liberalism, reformism, populism and ultra-leftism", 28 August 2005
- "The people shall govern – class struggles and post-1994 state in South Africa", 2005
- "Chris Hani", 1 April 2005
- "Blank pages in history should be allowed – the role of revolutionary intellectuals"m, February 25, 2006
- " The SACP, eighty-five years of unbroken communist struggle in South Africa", 17 July 2006
- "the role of revolutionary intellectuals", 2006
- "Joe Slovo – Democracy and Socialism",18 January 2007
- " A post-1994 South African state", 2007
- "In defence of the new ANC", 18 February 2008
- "Netshitenzhe misses the point", 12 June 2009
- "For the SACP recall of President Mbeki is not an obsession", 18 June 2008
- "The present economic crisis in the world capitalist system – and prospects for the left", 28 January 2009
- "Debunking Dalai Lama", 1 April 2009
- "Defend the parastatal sector!", 2 September, 2009
- "Some thoughts on the global economic crisis", 7 September 2009
- "The future of the state", 23 October 2009
- "Should we nationalise the mines?", 18 November 2009
- "Nationalisation debate...more and more curious", December 2009
- "Let us close ranks against factionalism. Let us close ranks against corruption", 17 March 2010
- "Response to Mondli Makhanya, 6 April 2011
- "The E-toll saga – ideological confusions and strange bedfellows", 15 March 2012
- "Let's not get pushed into opposing corners by those who don't have interests of our Alliance and our country at heart", 13 December 2012
- "Why Chris Hani's killer Clive Derby-Lewis should not get a parole", 3 July 2014
- "What lies behind the current turmoil within COSATU?, 27 November 2014
- "What is going on in South Africa's Parliament?" 20 February 2015
- "Message of Solidarity to National Union of Mineworkers", 4 June 2015
- "Do we need an independent media tribunal?" 20 August 2015
- "Former President Mbeki doesn't get it", 20 January 2016
- "Corporate Capture, Money and Politics – Part Two", 3 November 2016
- "No slightest glimmer of reciprocal self-reflection on Ratshitinga's side", 19 June 2017

== See also ==
- African Commission on Human and Peoples' Rights
- Constitution of South Africa
- History of the African National Congress
- Politics in South Africa
- Provincial governments of South Africa
