= Breakout (Canadian TV program) =

- Genre: Docudrama
- Countries of origin: Canada; United Kingdom
- Original language: English
- No. of seasons: 2
- No. of episodes: 16

Production
- Producers: Jeremy Hall; Rebecca North
- Production location: Canada
- Production companies: Raw TV; Cream

Original release
- Network: Discovery Channel Canada; National Geographic Channel; ITV4
- Release: March 28, 2010 – March 23, 2013

Breakout is a Canadian television series that aired on the National Geographic Channel throughout the world. It dramatizes real life prison breakouts. The series premiered on March 28, 2010, and aired its last episode on March 23, 2013. It was listed as a Canada/UK co-production.

A number of different producers, writers, actors and other film professionals worked on different episodes.

Episode 15, which featured the prison escape of South African political prisoners Tim Jenkin, Stephen Lee and Alex Moumbaris from Pretoria Central Prison in 1979, was shown in the United Kingdom on 19 April 2013.

This escape was again dramatized in the feature-length film, Escape from Pretoria, starring Daniel Radcliffe.

== Episodes ==
=== Season 1 (2010) ===
No. overall	No. in season	Title	Inmate(s)	Prison	Original release date
1	1	"The Texas Seven"	George Rivas, Joseph Garcia, Patrick Murphy, Donald Newbury, Randy Halprin, Larry Harper and Michael Rodriguez	Connally Unit (Kenedy, Texas)	March 28, 2010
2	2	"The Pittsburgh Six"	Nuno Pontes, Thomas Berkelbaugh, Carmen Keller, George Conard, Andrew Heim and Kevin Billingsley	Western Penitentiary (Pittsburgh)	March 28, 2010
3	3	"The Running Man"	Dennis Hope, Harry Decker and Jason Montgomery	Darrington Unit (Rosharon, Texas)	March 31, 2010
4	4	"The Escapist"	Quawntay Adams	Alton Jail (Alton, Illinois)	April 7, 2010
5	5	"Prison Romance"	George Hyatte	Northwest Correctional Complex (Tiptonville, Tennessee)	April 15, 2010
6	6	"Ohio's Most Wanted"	John Parsons	Ross County Jail (Chillicothe, Ohio)	April 21, 2010
7	7	"Through the Roof"	Timothy Vail and Timothy Morgan	Elmira Correctional Facility (Elmira, New York)	April 29, 2010
8	8	"Escape to Vegas"	Jody Kenneth Thompson	Northern Nevada Correctional Center (Carson City, Nevada)	May 5, 2010

=== Season 2 (2013) ===
No. overall	No. in season	Title	Inmate(s)	Prison	Original release date
9	1	"Escape from Supermax"	Roy Harper and John Woolard	Mississippi State Penitentiary (Mississippi)	February 2, 2013
10	2	"The Real MacGyver"	Harold Laird	Mark W. Stiles Unit (Beaumont, Texas)	February 9, 2013
11	3	"Tunnel Break"	Lance Battreal, Charles Smith and Mark Booher	Indiana State Prison (Michigan City, Indiana)	February 16, 2013
12	4	"Island Fortress"	Matthew Williams, Keith Rose and Andrew Rodger	HM Prison Parkhurst (United Kingdom)	February 23, 2013
13	5	"The Connecticut Conspiracy"	Ronald Rutan and Frank Vandever	Somers Prison (Somers, Connecticut)	March 2, 2013
14	6	"Escape from Indian River"	Rondell Reed and Levi Taylor	Indian River County Jail (Vero Beach, Florida)	March 9, 2013
15	7	"Keys to Freedom"	Tim Jenkin, Stephen Lee and Alex Moumbaris	Pretoria Central Prison (South Africa)	March 16, 2013
16	8	"Southsider Gang Escape"	Tommy Valdez, Johnathan Rodriguez and Arturo Torres	Grant County Jail (Santa Clara, New Mexico)	March 23, 2013
