= Escape from Pretoria =

2020 film by Francis Annan

- Theatrical release poster
- Directed by: Francis Annan
- Written by: Francis Annan; L.H. Adams
- Based on: Inside Out: Escape from Pretoria Prison by Tim Jenkin
- Produced by: Mark Blaney; Jackie Sheppard; David Barron; Michelle Krumm; Gary Hamilton
- Starring: Daniel Radcliffe; Daniel Webber; Ian Hart; Mark Leonard Winter
- Cinematography: Geoffrey Hall
- Edited by: Nick Fenton
- Music by: David Hirschfelder
- Production companies: South Australian Film Corporation; Particular Crowd; Spier Films; Enriched Media Group; Storybridge Films; Footprint Films (UK) (Note: Not to be confused with the Australian film distribution company, Footprint Films, headed by Australian filmmakers Robert Connolly and John Maynard.); Beagle Pug Films
- Distributed by: Signature Entertainment
- Release date: 6 March 2020 (United Kingdom)
- Running time: 106 minutes
- Countries: Australia; United Kingdom
- Language: English
- Box office: $2.4 million

Escape from Pretoria is a 2020 prison film co-written and directed by Francis Annan, based on the real-life prison escape by three political prisoners in South Africa in 1979, starring Daniel Radcliffe and Daniel Webber. It is based on the 2003 book Inside Out: Escape from Pretoria Prison by Tim Jenkin, one of the escapees.

An international co-production between Australia and the United Kingdom, the film was shot in Adelaide, South Australia, in early 2019, both on location in the city and suburbs and in the Glenside studios of the South Australian Film Corporation.

== Plot ==
In 1978, Tim Jenkin and Stephen Lee; two white South Africans, are carrying out anti-apartheid missions in South Africa. They are arrested on the spot and prosecuted; Jenkin is sentenced to twelve years and Lee is sentenced to eight. At the courthouse Lee attempts to escape but to no avail. Transported to Pretoria Prison, they meet Denis Goldberg, an older political prisoner serving four life sentences for previous work against apartheid. He shows them the ropes but discourages them from trying to escape.

Jenkin and Lee discuss escaping with another prisoner, Leonard Fontaine. They settle in and go about their daily routines, but Jenkin starts to analyze the prison and think of ways to escape. He steals items from the wood shop to make wooden keys that fit the locks to their cells. He sneaks around the prison at night, making keys for other locks. Lee and Jenkin bury these keys in the prison garden while tending it and make many other preparations for their escape.

Fontaine and Jenkin do a test run by using keys to leave their cells. They hide in a closet as the night guard walks by. They use another key to leave the cell block, but they have to run back to their cells before they can use another key. The guards search everyone's cells the next day but fail to find anything. Later, Jenkin discovers that a new gun tower is being built. He, Fontaine and Lee present their plan to Goldberg and other prisoners who decide against trying to escape with them.

Jenkin, Lee and Fontaine execute their plan. They gather keys hidden in various areas and change into previously smuggled street clothes. Once again, they hide in the closet to evade the night guard. Unexpectedly, the night guard comes back to the closet. Goldberg short-circuits the light in his cell, causing the electricity to go out and calls for the guard, distracting him so that the trio can reach the last door. They cannot get any of the keys to work on this door, but Fontaine breaks it open using a chisel and screwdriver. They leave the prison and find a taxi driven by a black driver to take them out of Pretoria after offering him cash.

It transpires that the biggest manhunt ensued in the aftermath, but they managed to escape to London via Mozambique and Tanzania. The three continued their protests against apartheid under the African National Congress Party; they were ultimately pardoned in 1991. Goldberg was finally released in 1985 after spending 22 years in prison. In 1992, a year after Jenkin, Lee and Fontaine's exoneration, the apartheid referendum is held and most white South Africans vote in favour of dismantling apartheid.

== Cast ==
- Daniel Radcliffe as Tim Jenkin
- Daniel Webber as Stephen Lee
- Ian Hart as Denis Goldberg
- Mark Leonard Winter as Leonard Fontaine (character based on Alex Moumbaris)
- Nathan Page as Mongo
- Grant Piro as Captain Schnepel
- Adam Ovadia as Van Zadelhoff
- Adam Tuominen as Jeremy Cronin
- Tim Jenkin as prisoner in the prison waiting room (extra, non-speaking role)

== Production ==
The film was written and directed by Francis Annan. The film is an Australia-UK co-production, co-financed by Arclight Films, New York-based Magna Entertainment and with the assistance of the South Australian Film Corporation. Sam Neill was originally cast as Goldberg, in May 2017.

Filming commenced on location in Adelaide, South Australia, in March 2019, with some scenes being shot at Mitcham railway station and others in the centre of the city, in Pirie Street. Jenkin spent some time in Adelaide, advising Radcliffe on accent and other aspects of the film, as well as playing as an extra, playing a prisoner next to Radcliffe in the visiting room.

The film contains two pieces of music by the Austrian composer Wolfgang Amadeus Mozart: The Dies Irae from his Requiem Mass in D minor and the Kyrie from his Mass in C minor. The latter was also featured prominently in a classic prison film, A Man Escaped directed by Robert Bresson.

== Release ==
Escape from Pretoria was released on 6 March 2020 in the United Kingdom by Signature Entertainment and in the United States by eOne and Momentum Pictures. It was released for rental on digital platforms iTunes, Sky Store, Amazon Prime Video and Virgin on the same date, and had a limited cinema release in the UK, US and some other countries. It became available to buy on DVD and Blu-ray from 20 April 2020.

The film was screened on 11 July 2020 at select cinemas in Adelaide as part of Adelaide Film Festival, after cinemas had just reopened in the wake of the COVID-19 pandemic in Australia.

The film was added to Netflix in February 2025.

== Reception ==
On the review aggregator website Rotten Tomatoes, the film holds an approval rating of 73% based on 44 reviews, with an average rating of 6.4/10. The website's critics consensus reads: "Escape from Pretoria doesn't quite do justice to the fact-based story it's dramatizing, but that lack of depth is offset by suitably gripping jailbreak action." On Metacritic, the film has a weighted average score of 56 out of 100, based on 7 critics, indicating "mixed or average reviews".
