= Dorethea van der Merwe =

First South African woman to be hanged for murder under the Union of South Africa

- Born: 1880; Transvaal, South African Republic
- Died: 16 August 1921 (aged 40); Pretoria Central Prison, Union of South Africa
- Other names: Dorethea Kraft; Dina van der Merwe
- Occupation: Farmer
- Status: Executed by hanging
- Motive: Financial gain
- Conviction: Murder
- Penalty: Death

Details
- Victims: Louis Tumpowski
- Date: 2 February 1918
- Country: Union of South Africa

Dorethea van der Merwe (1880 – 16 August 1921), also known as Dorethea Kraft and sometimes incorrectly referred to as "Dorothea", was the first woman hanged in the Union of South Africa. In 1921 she was convicted of the murder of Louis Tumpowski. He had been murdered on her farm, Treurfontein ("Sorrow fountain"), in Lichtenburg, Transvaal in 1918.

== Treurfontein farm ==
The present-day town of Coligny is situated on Treurfontein farm. It has been the site of tragic events both before and after the murder of Louis Tumpowski. In 1914 General Louis Botha announced his intention to invade South West Africa, then referred to locally as German West Africa, as part of the assistance of Great Britain during the First World War. Koos de la Rey was amongst those opposed to it and travelled to a meeting in Potchefstroom, via a gathering at the farm, where he was to meet senior military officials. He was shot and killed at a police road-block near the farm. Official accounts of the incident vary, with some stating that de la Rey did not stop at the road-block, while others state that his vehicle was mistaken for one belonging to the Foster gang. The day after the funeral a meeting was held at the farm and tensions ran high as it was suspected that de la Rey had been killed deliberately.

The farm belonged to Dorethea van der Merwe who was then using the name Dorethea Kraft. Records of her early life are not readily available but it is believed that she had either been divorced or widowed and was trying to eke out an existence on the farm with the help of her daughter, Polly, and the black labourers. Several seasons of severe drought coupled with poor soil quality had resulted in her efforts being reduced to subsistence farming, which was further exacerbated by the common practice amongst the farm workers of being recalcitrant and not accepting instructions from women.

== Victim ==
Louis Tumpowski was a Jewish immigrant from the United States who arrived in South Africa in 1887 at the age of twenty-five. He made his way to Johannesburg, which was a small but rapidly expanding mining town at that time, with the intention of selling general provisions to the gold mine workers and prospectors. Even as his business prospered he would still personally visit farms and smallholdings in the area to obtain fresh supplies and this was how the 54 year old Tumpowski met Dorethea Kraft.

== Contract ==
Although Kraft had little to sell to Tumpowski, she engaged him in conversation and she asked him to find a manager to run the farm for her. He returned with the proposal that he would rent the farm for £ a year while Kraft and her daughter could remain on the farm. She was very pleased with this idea and on 21 May 1914 she signed the lease-agreement that Tumpowski's lawyers had written, without reading the fine-print. As an added bonus for him, Tumpowski not only managed the farm but also "kept Dorethea's bed warm at night."

The situation at the farm did not improve and Kraft decided that it would be better for her, and for her daughter, to sell the farm as the land prices had increased dramatically. She would be able to make a large enough profit for them to live on. Furthermore, Tumpowski did not seem inclined to marry her.

However, on learning of Kraft's plan, Tumpowski showed her the contract she had signed that would allow him to buy the land at less than half of its value at that time. Kraft was angry that she had been cheated and more so at herself for not reading the fine-print. She decided to use "her feminine wiles" to convince Tumpowski to marry her and would then nullify the contract in their pre-nuptial agreement. Tumpowski saw no reason to marry her and refused.

== Witchdoctor ==
Kraft decided that she needed the assistance of a local witchdoctor, a coloured man named Jim Bird (sometimes referred to as 'Jim Burds' or 'Whiskers') who lived on a neighbouring farm. She got a love potion from him but Tumpowski proved to be immune to it. The only effect it had was to cause cramps and an upset stomach. Tumpowski accused Kraft of trying to kill him and from then on refused to eat or drink anything she had made.

A second attempt at a magical potion was made by Jim Bird, which involved a lock of Tumpowski's hair mixed with the magic potion, placed in a matchbox and buried under his door. This potion was supposed to kill Tumpowski but it had no effect.

== Accomplices ==
In 1918, Hermanus Lambertus Swartz, an army deserter came to Treurfontein looking for work and Kraft saw this as an opportunity. Swartz soon became Polly's suitor but also slept with Kraft on occasion. Swartz saw the opportunity to become the owner of Treurfontein if he married Polly and got rid of Tumpowski. He suggested to Kraft that she stop trying to use magic potions and just kill Tumpowski. He also suggested that Jim Bird would commit the murder. Bird agreed, for the price of £100.

== Murder ==
On the evening of 2 February 1918 a heavy thunderstorm broke over the farm. Kraft, Swartz, Bird and three labourers gathered in the farmhouse kitchen while Polly remained in her bedroom. Swartz opened Tumpowski's bedroom door and shoved Bird into the room. Bird attacked the man with a knopkierie and tried to leave but Swartz wasn't convinced that Tumpowski was dead and kept sending him back to finish the job. Eventually, Kraft held Tumpowski's hands while Swartz strangled him with a leather thong and then cut his throat. Kraft asked bird to use his magic to hide Tumpowski's blood and offered to pay him an additional £100 but Bird fled the scene. Kraft, Swartz and the labourers buried Tumpowski's body outside near a rubbish dump. While they were digging the grave a knocking was heard at the front door of the house. It was a couple with a sick child that had come to the farmhouse seeking help. No one answered the door and the lights in the house were turned off. Eventually the couple left but they had heard the sounds of the digging. By the next day the storm had washed all traces of the murder away.

== Aftermath ==
Polly left the next day for Johannesburg and Kraft complained to the neighbours that Tumpowski had abandoned the farm. Kraft went to stay with one of the neighbours for a while under the pretence that she was afraid to live alone at the farm. A potential buyer for the farm appeared but Kraft couldn't negotiate a deal with him as he knew that Tumpowski had first right to purchase the property and he wanted to negotiate with Tumpowski.

Another neighbour, Michael Denyusschen, did not accept Kraft's story and eventually informed the local police of his suspicions. Denyusschen's cousin, Johanna wrote to Tumpowski's sister, Mrs Hetty Saltman, in Rhodesia telling her of Tumpowski's disappearance.

The person who wanted to purchase the farm also got in contact with Mrs Saltman and in light of this and the letter from Johanna, Mrs Saltman sent her husband Mr Joseph Louis Saltman to the farm to investigate and contacted the police, who then visited Treurfontein. Kraft claimed that Trumpowski had left without paying the annual rent of £25 and went so far as to try to claim it from Mrs Saltman. Kraft claimed that Trumpowski had absconded most probably to avoid other debts he had incurred. However, Saltman knew that Trumpowski was not in any kind of financial distress.

== Investigation ==
The police became aware of the option clause in the rental agreement between Kraft and Tumpowski but without a body they would not pursue the matter. It took until 20 July 1920 before the police decided to conduct a full-scale search of the farm and to dig up the garden, drain the well, demolish walls and lift floorboards. The on-site investigation lasted six weeks and the manual labour was performed by a small band of convicts. They found nothing and in desperation the police offered a reward of £100 for any information.

The police investigation led to John Bird and on 20 August 1920 they interviewed him. It appears that his fear of the police was greater than his faith in his witchcraft as he quickly capitulated under police questioning and admitted his part in the murder. He identified the other parties involved but could not tell the police what had happened to the body as he had fled the scene earlier. Bird was forced to join the convicts in the search for the body.

A torrential rainstorm caused the ground to subside at the burial site and on 22 September 1920 the body was located, by Bird, near the rubbish dump. Although badly decomposed, a signet ring was used to identify the body as that of Tumpowski. His boots were also identified by a local cobbler.

Dorethea Kraft (who had in the interim married a man named van der Merwe), Swartz and the three labourers were arrested for murder.

== Trial ==
The trial was held at Potchefstroom on 13 June 1921. As this was the first trial of a white women for murder the public galleries at the trial were very well attended.

During the trial it was revealed that the cause of death was the fractured skull Tumpowski had suffered at the hands of Bird. Bird became a Crown witness in exchange for leniency. He claimed that Kraft had rewarded him with money and sexual favours for his participation in the murder. She did not deny this.

Kraft and Swartz were both sentenced to death, while the three labourers were acquitted. They were both hanged at Pretoria Central Prison in 1921.

== See also ==
- Capital punishment in South Africa
- Daisy de Melker - South Africa's first female serial killer
