= Tim Jenkin =

South African writer and activist, known for 1979 prison escape from Pretoria Prison

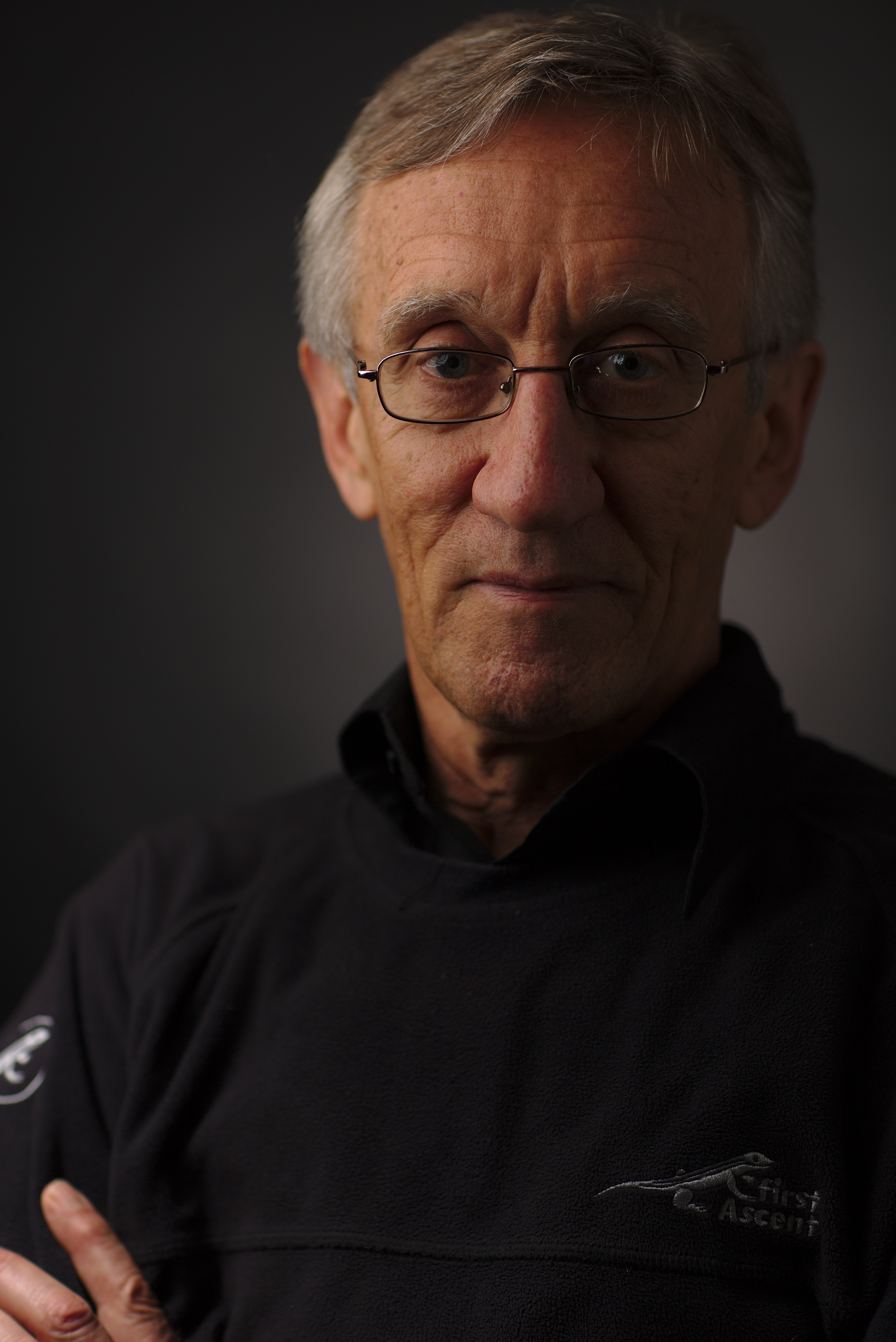
- Jenkin in 2017
- Born: 1948 (age 77–78); Cape Town, South Africa
- Education: University of Cape Town
- Occupations: Writer, political and monetary activist
- Employer(s): Community Exchange System (founder and director)
- Known for: Prison escape
- Political party: African National Congress

Timothy Peter Jenkin (born 1948) is a South African writer, anti-apartheid activist and former political prisoner. He is best known for his 1979 escape from Pretoria Local Prison (part of the Pretoria Central Prison complex), along with Stephen Lee and Alex Moumbaris.

== Biography ==
=== Early life and education ===
Jenkin was born in Cape Town and educated at Rondebosch Boys' Prep and Boys' High School, matriculating aged 17. After leaving school, he avoided conscription into the South African Defence Force, and worked at a variety of jobs for two years, with no particular interest in anything except motorcycle racing. He left for the UK in 1970, where, working in a fibreglass factory under poor working conditions and little pay, found the system unjust and developed an interest in sociology. This led him to learning more about the injustice in his own country. He later wrote that he had "grown up a 'normal' complacent white South African" who "unthinkingly accepted the system and for twenty-one years never questioned it."

At the end of 1970 Jenkin enrolled at the University of Cape Town (UCT) and graduated with a Bachelor of Social Science degree at the end of 1973.

=== Early political activities ===
Jenkin met Stephen Lee in a sociology class at UCT. They became friends and, in a South African version of Samizdat, Jenkins and Lee sought out literature banned by the ruling National Party. They then photocopied it and swapped it with other students. They both found their sociology course disappointing, as the material reinforced the status quo of apartheid. Through reading material banned by the government, they came to see the "naked reality" of apartheid and the undemocratic behavior of the ruling party, and felt a burning desire to effect positive change, which, Jenkin concluded, was only possible using unconstitutional means under the current regime. During this time they learnt of the activities of the African National Congress (ANC), which was an illegal organisation in South Africa.

In February 1974, Jenkin and Lee left the country to join the ANC in London, with the intention of helping to bring about change in South Africa. Here, Jenkin met his future wife Robin. While awaiting clearance for membership, Jenkin worked as a social worker at a reform school in Swindon. After acceptance by the ANC, he and Lee received training from the ANC in various tactics, in particular how to spread their propaganda leaflets, and how to set up communication and financial structures.

Upon return to Cape Town in July 1975, Lee and Jenkin bought a typewriter, duplicator and stationery to print and post pamphlets and leased first a garage and then a tiny apartment. Jenkin worked as a researcher for the Institute for Social Development at the University of the Western Cape, a university for South Africans of mixed racial ancestry, or Coloureds. In March 1976, Lee went to Johannesburg to look for work, and the ANC coincidentally sent them both on their first mission, to disperse leaflets urging support for the ANC via a leaflet bomb (using a new design developed by Jenkin) in Johannesburg, close to the anniversary of the Sharpeville Massacre on 21 March. They achieved this mission, managing to distribute hundreds of leaflets by means of several leaflet bombs, the text of which is reproduced in Jenkin's memoir.

After the success of their first mission, Jenkin worked on refining the mechanism by adding a triggering system to the leaflet bomb, so that they did not have to be close to it when it went off. He successfully distributed leaflets this way on Cape Town's Grand Parade. Lee worked for the University of the Witwatersrand, while Jenkin ran the "cell" on his own in Cape Town. Jenkin went to London at the request of the ANC in May 1976, while Lee continued to plant leaflet bombs around Johannesburg. In July, four ANC operatives including author Jeremy Cronin were arrested doing similar work in Cape Town and were given prison sentences.

Undeterred, Jenkin continued the work in Cape Town, finding a new premises and regularly changing their printing equipment, and both carried out further leaflet bombings in Johannesburg. There were a few worrying signs that Jenkin was being monitored, but he went to London to see Robin for six weeks and returned without incident. In September, he and Lee hung a 10-metre-long banner with the words "ANC LIVES" from a high building in the centre of Cape Town, along with a timed device which distributed hundreds of leaflets over the crowds below. Lee moved back to Cape Town in December after enrolling in a master's degree in sociology, and the two continued their undercover work, but unbeknownst to them they were by this time under surveillance by the Security Branch of the South African Police.

=== Arrest and prison ===
At 3am the morning of 2 March 1978, Jenkin and Lee were both arrested, after being seen moving their printing equipment into their own dwelling. They were never told how the security police got onto them, and Jenkin concluded that it must have been the result of meticulous police work and long surveillance.

They were taken to Caledon Square Police Station, the head office of the Security Branch in Cape Town, where they were separated, interrogated and put into cells, without being informed of the charges or their rights. This was legal under Section 6 of the Terrorism Act, which allowed detention without trial for up to 60 days, and was extendable. Lee made an escape attempt and nearly succeeded. After a spell in the notorious John Vorster Square in Johannesburg, they were returned to Cape Town and after four weeks, allowed to see family, and held at Pollsmoor Prison as they awaited trial. After Lee's father brought him a copy of the book Papillon, the book inspired them to seriously consider the prospect of escape and they concentrated on rigorous observations of the world around them.

Along with Lee, Jenkin was charged with "producing and distributing 18 different pamphlets on behalf of banned organisations" including the South African Communist Party, the ANC and its armed wing, Umkhonto we Sizwe, from 1975 to 1978, and urging people to join the liberation movement. The trial in the Cape Town Supreme Court went from 6 to 15 June 1978. Upon legal advice, both pleaded guilty to all charges. They were both found guilty on one charge, with Jenkin receiving a 12-year sentence and Lee eight.

==== Escape ====
After their incarceration, Jenkin, Lee and several other inmates began plotting an escape, which would involve copies of several prison keys that Jenkin made from wood and pieces of wire. Jenkin had smuggled some money into prison. The initial plan was that eight of the political prisoners would escape, leaving behind two who were nearing the end of their sentences. One of the intending escapees, Denis Goldberg, communicated with comrades in the ANC through coded letters sent to Baruch Hirson in London. Hirson then communicated with Joe Slovo in Mozambique and a date for the escape was set and an escape vehicle arranged.

As the plan evolved it became clear that for the escape to be successful it would have to be restricted to three people, who would have to hide in a small closet at one point. The escape preparations brought some differences of opinion amongst the political prisoners, but they remained comrades and all contributed in some way to the escape effort. The fact that they were all in prison for their political activities and beliefs united them, and "as members of a revolutionary organisation they were disciplined and shared in their suffering collectively". Goldberg and the others decided to withdraw from the escape, with Goldberg continuing to be involved in the preparations.

In December 1979, Jenkin, Lee and fellow inmate Alex Moumbaris broke out of Pretoria Central Prison using handmade keys to ten of the doors leading out of the prison, after several hair-raising moments when encountering unforeseen obstacles. Goldberg distracted the warden while the three made their escape. The street was deserted, but they still had to find their way out of South Africa, into Mozambique and to freedom. This had involved a great deal of planning but there were still many challenges in the execution, travelling via Angola, Zambia and Tanzania finally to London.

=== Life after prison ===
Jenkin and Lee appeared at a press conference in Lusaka with Oliver Tambo on 2 January 1980 to tell their stories, before moving to London, where Jenkin worked as a research officer for the International Defence and Aid Fund. He and Lee went on a speaking tour in Sweden in the early 1980s.

When living in Islington, still with the ANC, Jenkin devised a system for encrypted communication so that the ANC could communicate with their agents. Messages were typed into a computer, encrypted and saved to audio cassette, then sent from a public callbox to an answering machine. The system was never cracked and helped the ANC coordinate in the run up to Nelson Mandela's release from prison.

In 2024, the computer programming code relating to the Operation Vula encryption and communication system was released and is now available on GitHub.

Jenkin returned to South Africa in 1991 to manage the ANC's communications network. He worked for the ANC Elections Briefing Unit from 1994 (the year of the first fully democratic elections in South Africa), before being appointed head of their Electronic Information Unit in Cape Town later that year. In 1997, he became a director of Unwembi Communications (Pty) Ltd.

Around the turn of the millennium, Jenkin co-founded the Community Exchange System, an internet-based moneyless exchange for local communities, comparable to LETS, writing the entirety of its software. A decade later Jenkin also created Clearing Central, a 2nd tier exchange for moneyless exchange between groups. In 2015 he went on a national tour in Australia organised by Karel Boele, speaking about his escape and community currencies.

In 2017, he was invited by Toool Netherlands to give a talk about the lockpicking part of his escape.

== Recognition ==
- In 2007 he was elected an Ashoka fellow for his ongoing work on the Community Exchange System.
- In April 2018 he was awarded the RSA Conference Award for Excellence in the Field of Humanitarian Service.

== Books, TV and film ==
In 1987 his book, Escape from Pretoria, was published in London. A new edition was published in Johannesburg and London as Inside Out : Escape from Pretoria Prison in 2003. In 1995, Jenkin wrote a 6-part article series called Talking to Vula: The Story of the Secret Underground Communications Network of Operation Vula. In 2013, the story of the prison escape was dramatised in the 7th episode of the 2nd season of Breakout, a television series made by National Geographic TV channel dramatising real-life prison escapes. The video features excerpts from interviews with Jenkin, Lee, Moumbaris, and Goldberg filmed in 2012, between re-enacted prison escape scenes.

In 2014 a documentary film called The Vula Connection, about Jenkin and his part in the creation of an ingenious secret communication system that enabled Operation Vula operatives to penetrate South Africa's borders in secret, ultimately smuggling messages to the imprisoned Nelson Mandela, was made by Marion Edmunds.

In May 2017, it was announced that production would start on a film of Jenkin's book, produced by David Barron and starring Daniel Radcliffe as Jenkin and Ian Hart as Goldberg. Filming of Escape from Pretoria began in Adelaide, South Australia, in March and April 2019, with Daniel Webber joining the cast as Lee. Jenkin spent some time in Adelaide, advising Radcliffe on accent and other aspects of the film, as well as playing as an extra, playing a prisoner next to Radcliffe in the visiting room. The film was released on 6 March 2020, first in the UK and USA and then in the rest of the world. He also participated in a local parkrun, a hobby which he said stemmed back from his days of running to keep fit in prison.

== Published works ==
- Escape from Pretoria (PDF). London: Kliptown. 1987. ISBN 978-0-904759-77-8. OCLC 924674792.
- "Talking to Vula: The Story of the Secret Underground Communications Network of Operation Vula". 1995. Archived from the original on 22 July 2018.
- Inside Out: Escape from Pretoria Prison (repr. illus. ed.). Jacana Media. 2003. ISBN 978-1-919931-50-0. OCLC 653065100.
- "Operation Vula encryption and communication programming code". GitHub.
