= Capital punishment in South Africa =

Capital punishment in South Africa was abolished on 6 June 1995 by the ruling of the Constitutional Court in the case of S v Makwanyane, following a five year and four month moratorium that had been in effect since February 1990.

== History ==
The standard method for carrying out executions was hanging, sometimes of several convicts at the same time. Mandatory death penalty for murder was abolished in 1935, comparable to the similar act passed in the United Kingdom in 1957. Before this reform, vast numbers of delinquents were sentenced to death without having their sentences carried out, with only 24% of capital verdicts being carried out in the period 1925 to 1935 (including 7% of verdicts against women).

The reform was supported by Prime Minister Jan Smuts, who decried the draconian rates of nominal sentences, favouring greater discretion for judges which were ultimately brought into the penal code with a rule of extenuating circumstances, which largely were maintained into the Criminal Procedure Act, 1977, which is largely still in force. At the same time, criminal justice saw an increased racialisation in disfavour of the non-white majority, who represented the vast majority of accused and convicted in capital cases. In part this was because of the jury system, completely dominated by White South Africans because an ongoing effort to suppress the franchise for non-white citizens. Non-white jurors (in effect only occurring in the Cape Province), although retaining the right to vote until 1960, were removed by statute in 1954. In the case of women defendants, an all-women jury could be selected.

== Reform ==
Hanging was maintained as the preferred method, as in most post-independence cases of criminal law, following South Africa's independence as a republic in 1961. At the same time, South Africa saw mounting international criticism against purposely political executions of anti-apartheid activists convicted of violent crimes; mainly blacks, but occasionally whites, the case of Frederick John Harris in 1965 being exemplary. Most verdicts were for homicide, the vastly most common reason for being on death row, others under anti-terrorism legislation. Rape, under aggravated circumstances, was also a capital crime.

Judge Quartus de Wet - of the Rivonia Trial - explicitly iterated that the prosecution's selection of indicting the accused, Nelson Mandela et al., for sabotage and not high treason, supported his decision to issue a sentence of life imprisonment for those convicted, rather than an expected sentence of hanging. The jury system, having been set aside for serious cases by special statutes (e.g. the Rivonia Trial). Already in 1947, 75% of criminal trials had been by judge (usually assisted by two assessors), not jury, largely as result of the selection by the accused. In capital trials, the three-judge panel was mandatory if selected. Certain discretion was also granted to the Minister of Justice to decide on trial by judge regarding interracial crimes, further eroding the likelihood of trial by jury. The layman participation was finally scrapped by the Abolition of Juries Act of 1969, with half a percent (0,48%) of trials in 1968 being decided by juries. Liberal writer and opposition politician Alan Paton later stated that the abolition of juries, although part of criminal reforms to bring the procedure under the control of the government, likely did increase legal security for black defendants, due to the widespread prejudice of white juries.

The 1980s, a period of incremental constitutional change and lessening of some apartheid provisions, nevertheless saw a decline in even fundamental standards of rule of law and rapid increase in the number of executions; 164 in 1987 alone (an official tally higher than that of any other country, including the People's Republic of China and Iran). Since 1959, the South African government officially performed 2,949 hangings (14 of women), including 1,123 in the 1980s. Of over one hundred South Africans executed in 1988, only three were white, all sentenced for the murder of whites. Despite the obviously skewed verdicts, most capital cases ended not with execution; out of 83 black South Africans convicted of killing whites between June 1982 and June 1983, a minority of 38 were hanged, as well as one white convicted of killing a white (out of 52). One rare instance of whites sentenced to death for killing a black person involved the murder of Ginny Goitsione, who was sexually assaulted and burned alive by two white offenders in 1985. These numbers show, as a whole, the vast use of the "extenuating circumstances" rule in a country deeply steeped in racial strife, with widespread incidents of violence and presumed threat making such a defence justifiable. One landmark case, concerning both race and juvenile executions, was that of Marlene Lehnberg in 1974, an Afrikaner woman sentenced to death for conspiring with Marthinus Choegoe, a Coloured man, to kill her lover's wife. Both were sentenced to death, but the sentences were vacated on appeal and Lehnberg and Choegoe were re-sentenced to 20 and 15 years, respectively. While both defendants were adults, Lehnberg was only 18 and the crux of the precedent, SA v. Lehnberg, refined was that an abundantly strong presumption for extenuating circumstances would prevail in cases involving a minor.

All executions were carried out in Pretoria Central Prison; condemned prisoners were held in a section of the prison called "The Pot".

== Moratorium and abolition ==
The last execution carried out by the South African government was the hanging of Solomon Ngobeni in November 1989. The last woman executed was Sandra Smith on June 2 the same year along with her boyfriend Yassiem Harris, in all cases following an aggravated murder conviction. In February 1990, a moratorium was declared by President De Klerk. Two further executions were, however, carried out in the nominally independent "homelands" of Boputhatswana and Venda in 1990 and 1991 respectively, almost universally considered parts of South Africa at the time, but with little to no intervention from South African authorities.

Although the death penalty was abolished in 1995, opinion polls suggest significant public support for its reinstatement. A 2014 poll in South Africa found that 76 percent of the Millennial generation South Africans support re-introduction of the death penalty.

== Current situation ==
There are a number of parties in South Africa that support the return of the death penalty. They are the African Christian Democratic Party, the African Transformation Movement (ATM), Patriotic Alliance, African Covenant, Alliance of Citizens for Change National Conservative Party of South Africa Freedom Front Plus and Spectrum National Party.

Other parties support a referendum on the death penalty, including the Inkatha Freedom Party (IFP), the National Freedom Party, and former president Jacob Zuma's party, MK.

In April 2020, former EFF Gauteng chairperson Mandisa Mashego announced that she supported the reinstatement of the death penalty in South Africa.

== See also ==
- Category:People executed by South Africa
- Life imprisonment in South Africa
- Necklacing in South Africa
