= David Rabkin =

South African activist (1948–1985)

- Born: 1948; Cape Town, South Africa
- Died: 22 November 1985 (aged 36–37); Angola
- Resting place: Luanda, Angola
- Education: PhD in literature
- Alma mater: University of Leeds
- Occupation: Journalist
- Years active: 1972–1985
- Notable work: Anti-apartheid activist
- Spouse: Susan
- Children: 2

David Rabkin (1948 – 22 November 1985) was a South African anti-apartheid activist known for publishing subversive pamphlets. He served seven years of a ten-year sentence for his anti-apartheid activities. After his accidental death during military training in Angola, he received a hero's burial in Luanda.

== Life ==
Rabkin was born in Cape Town, South Africa in 1948 to a Jewish family, but his family emigrated to Britain following the Sharpeville massacre in 1960. He received a Ph.D. in literature from the University of Leeds after a study on Black South African writers. He moved back to Cape Town with his wife Susan and started working at Cape Argus in 1972. At the time of his arrest in September 1976, Rabkin and his wife Susan had distributed around 15 different pamphlets supporting the African National Congress (ANC) and South African Communist Party (SACP).

== Imprisonment ==
In September 1976, he pled guilty to charges related to the terrorism and internal security act promoting the aims of the ANC and the SACP. The court found him guilty of publishing pamphlets calling for the overthrow of law and order. Rabkin was sentenced to ten years imprisonment for "furthering the aims of banned organizations". His wife, Susan, was eight months pregnant and was sentenced to a year, eleven months of which were suspended. During the trial, he stated:

The course of action laid out by the ANC and its sister organisations, including the SACP, offered the hope of releasing for the benefit of all South Africans, the energies, talents and aspirations of all our people. From the liberation of the African people, the most oppressed section of our population, would flow a just and democratic society, a South Africa that belonged to all who live in it, black and white.

After he pled guilty and was sentenced by judge Marius Diemont he gave the clenched-fist black power salute to the courtroom gallery. He was mistreated in prison, but helped those in the 1979 Pretoria Central Prison break. He allowed Denis Goldberg to purposefully break his loudspeaker to have an excuse to get a soldering iron, which allowed them to solder a makeshift key to facilitate an escape. Following the prison break he was questioned by prison authorities, but international attention led the punishments to be moderate for him and the other conspirators. He served seven years of his ten-year sentence and was released in 1983.

== Personal life ==
Rabkin was married to Susan and they had two children, Jobe and Franny. Following his release from prison in 1983, he continued working in journalism, and he moved to Maputo to continue reporting. His wife Susan was exiled after her one-month prison sentence, and after David's release from prison he too was exiled.

== Death ==
Rabkin was killed in an uMkhonto we Sizwe military training accident in Angola 22 November 1985, and was buried in Luanda. He received a hero's burial and an armed guard of Umkhonto we Sizwe stood guard at his coffin, which was draped in the two flags: the ANC and SACP. At his funeral, South African politician Joe Slovo and anti-apartheid activist Chris Hani gave speeches about Rabkin's qualities, courage and contributions.

== Legacy ==
In 2007 South African politician Ronnie Kasrils gave a speech to the South African parliament. He dedicated his speech about Israeli aggression to the memory of Rabkin.
