= Annanias Mathe =

Mozambican serial killer (1976–2016)

Annanias Mathe (c. 1976 – 27 December 2016), sometimes spelled Ananias Mathe, was a notorious serial rapist and armed robber from Mozambique. He achieved further notoriety in 2006 by being the only person to have ever escaped from the maximum high-security C-Max Penitentiary in Pretoria, South Africa.

Mathe was initially arrested on 51 counts of murder, attempted murder, rape, hijacking and armed robbery in November 2006.

Whilst being detained in the A6 ward of C-Max Penitentiary which houses dangerous and hardened criminals, Mathe allegedly managed to escape by smearing himself with petroleum jelly and sliding out of his cell window, which measured only 20 cm × 60 cm. This escape led the South African press to dub him 'Houdini'. It later surfaced that Mathe had actually escaped the prison by bribing warders with R80,000. Mathe had escaped from police custody in a similar way in April 2005 by offering policemen a R15,000 bribe.

His last escape prompted a nationwide manhunt, the events of which were closely monitored by local media. He was recaptured on 4 December 2006 when he hijacked a car in the affluent Johannesburg suburb of Craighall. Unknown to Mathe, the vehicle was fitted with a satellite tracking device, which led police and private security companies to Mathe after a chase during which he was shot three times in the leg and buttocks.

Mathe was found guilty on 67 of 71 charges including rape, attempted rape, attempted murder, robbery and theft, and was sentenced to 54 years imprisonment, with a minimum of 43 years. Six prison wardens linked to his latest escape were dismissed.

Mathe died in the Kgosi Mumpuru Correction Centre on 27 December 2016, after his health deteriorated. He reportedly suffered from constipation and urinary retention.
