= Thumper (film) =

2017 crime thriller movie

- Directed by: Jordan Ross
- Written by: Jordan Ross
- Produced by: Fernando Loureiro; Roberto Vasconcellos
- Starring: Eliza Taylor; Lena Headey; Pablo Schreiber; Ben Feldman; Daniel Webber; Grant Harvey
- Cinematography: Doug Emmett
- Edited by: Byron Wong
- Music by: Pedro Bromfaman
- Production companies: Exhibit; Automatik Entertainment; Parliament of Owls
- Distributed by: The Orchard
- Release dates: April 20, 2017 (Tribeca); November 7, 2017 (U.S.)
- Running time: 93 minutes
- Country: United States
- Language: English

Thumper is a 2017 crime thriller directed and written by Jordan Ross and starring Eliza Taylor, Lena Headey, Pablo Schreiber, Ben Feldman, Daniel Webber, and Grant Harvey. The film premiered at the 2017 Tribeca Film Festival and was released on November 7, 2017.

== Synopsis ==
In a town of low-income and fractured families, a group of teens are lured into working for a dangerous drug dealer. A new girl arrives who hides a dangerous secret that will impact everybody and change their lives forever.

New girl Kat Carter (Eliza Taylor) befriends classmate Beaver (Webber) in a community where drugs and violence run rampant and realizes how deep the drug problem is. Harbouring a dark secret of her own, she attracts the attention of the leader of a drug ring, Wyatt (Schreiber).

== Cast ==
- Eliza Taylor as Kat Carter/Meredith
- Pablo Schreiber as Wyatt Rivers
- Lena Headey as Ellen
- Ben Feldman as Jimmy
- Daniel Webber as Beaver
- Grant Harvey as Troy
- Britain Dalton as Dean

== Production ==
=== Casting ===
It was announced in April 2016 that Eliza Taylor and Daniel Webber had joined the cast of the film.

== Release ==
The film had its worldwide premiere at the 2017 Tribeca Film Festival on April 20, 2017. On June 5, 2017, it was announced that The Orchard had bought Thumper and it was given a limited release on November 7, 2017.

== Reception ==
=== Critical response ===
On review aggregator Rotten Tomatoes, the film has an approval rating of 86%, with an average rating of 6/10.

Frank Sheck of The Hollywood Reporter gave the film mixed reviews. Though he found Taylor a "talented, vivacious performer" he failed to find her role in the film convincing. On the other hand, he praised Schreiber, who he said "delivered a suitably intense and charismatic performance". However, he found the film unable to overcome its cliches.
