= Alex Moumbaris =

Political activist

- Born: Alexandre Moumbaris; Egypt
- Citizenship: French, Australian
- Occupations: Trade unionist, anti-apartheid activist

Alexandre Moumbaris is a political activist and former political prisoner. He was born in Egypt to Greek parents, grew up in Australia, lived and worked in the UK, was imprisoned in South Africa and now lives in France. He is known for his political activism against the apartheid régime in South Africa in the 1970s, and his subsequent incarceration in, and 1979 escape from, Pretoria Local Prison (within the Pretoria Central Prison complex) with Tim Jenkin and Stephen Lee. He returned to France after his escape.

== Biography ==
=== Early life and activism ===
Moumbaris's family migrated to Australia when he was young and he became a naturalised Australian citizen, but he left for France when he was 16 years old. There he met and married a French woman, Marie-José.

They moved to London in 1961, where Moumbaris worked for the IT department of Reuters-Comtel. He worked for about nine years before becoming involved with the ANC as one of the "London Recruits". He had not grown up in a political family, but when in Britain associated with Communists there and he was inspired by the communist resistance to the Axis occupation of Greece during World War II. He was also influenced by the Vietnam War and the Greek coup of the colonels in 1967. He started associating with African National Congress (ANC) exiles and beginning in 1967, he travelled in and out of South Africa transporting literature for the movement. He also once unfurled an ANC banner from a building in Durban, and was subsequently entrusted with more risky assignments.

Moumbaris became involved with the ANC at a time when the organisation had suffered many setbacks. The arrests at Liliesleaf and convictions which followed at the Rivonia Trial in 1963-4 were followed by widespread roundups of activists and leaders, including Bram Fischer and Wilton Mkwayi. Members' spirits were low and this combination of factors made it difficult for the ANC to re-infiltrate the combatants who had been trained abroad. There was an effort to rebuild the armed wing known as Umkhonto we Sizwe (MK), and a plan was hatched by Oliver Tambo, Joe Slovo and/or Moses Mabhida, with the help of the South African Communist Party to land 25 combatants plus arms via a boat previously purchased by the ANC, the Adventurer (or Avventura), on the Transkei coast via the Indian Ocean from Somalia. Moumbaris went to the USSR for training. However the boat had developed engine problems and had to return to Somalia. Instead, 25 guerillas were infiltrated overland, with Moumbaris aiding with border reconnaissance and transport, as commander of the receiving operation.

Moumbaris and Marie-José were caught while trying to enter South Africa from Botswana in 1972, after a previously-arrested comrade informed on them. Their arrest was part of a government sting to apprehend operatives from "the Moumbaris Adventurer Episode". Others were also caught, but they succeeded in infiltrating a number of trained militants. As Marie-José was pregnant at the time and under pressure from the French ambassador, she was not charged but instead deported back to France after four months.

In June 1973, Moumbaris was sentenced to 12 years in prison for conspiring with the ANC to "instigate violent revolution in South Africa', aiding guerrillas to enter the country, distributing ANC literature and reconnoitering the coast to find places for the sea-borne landing of guerrillas and arms.

On 23 October 1973, the matter of possible theft of documents from the Clapham Common home of Moumbaris and his wife was raised in the UK parliament by Labour party MP Alex Lyon. It was suspected South African agents may have raided the home for documents to use in Moumbaris' trial. Home Office Minister Mark Carlisle said no evidence had been found at that time of South African responsibility for illegal activities, but appropriate action would be taken should it appear.

=== Prison ===
Moumbaris was the only non-South African prisoner, and when Jenkin met him, he appeared as "a little aloof". He signalled his wish to be included in any possible escape plan to Jenkin even before the idea was presented to him, after Jenkin had mentioned he and Lee had brought some money into prison. He became instrumental to the escape plan in several ways, making the early suggestion any escape plan would have to involve the making of keys, providing a hacksaw which he had secreted after plumbers had left it behind, and getting involved in some of the riskier aspects of the planning and testing of the scheme. When an escape committee of three prisoners was set up, Moumbaris (and not Jenkin or Lee) was selected as he was "the most vociferous" and a good negotiator. His ongoing task of generating enthusiasm amongst the other inmates for the escape plan was onerous, and the stress affected his health.

His relationship with the jailers tended towards being outwardly defiant and somewhat aggressive, laughing at new wardens who tried to discipline him. This, along with his generally scruffy appearance and his refusal to keep his cell tidy led to a bad reputation amongst the prison wardens meant he had never been promoted beyond the "B" group in his six years in prison, while the others had reached "A" within two. However, after the escape plan had captured his imagination, he cleaned up and changed his attitude, and was soon promoted to the "A" group. The wardens were all Afrikaans-speaking and were not fluent in English, and while most of the prisoners were fairly fluent in Afrikaans, they were not familiar with the topics they talked about.

Moumbaris, although enrolled in university courses, did not undertake formal studies at all while in prison; it was a cover so extra books could be obtained from the university library for everyone to make use of; it was a way of keeping themselves informed about the world.

Marie-José was repeatedly denied a visitor's visa to visit him in prison, and in February 1978 Moumbaris went on a hunger strike to try to force the authorities to let her in, but after 10 days realised the futility of this and gave up. He was visited in prison twice a year by his mother and young son, Boris, from France. The only languages allowed to be spoken during visits were the two "official" languages, English and Afrikaans, but as Boris only spoke French and was deemed too young to be a security risk, allowed them to converse in French.

Moumbaris was allowed to see the French envoy from time to time, who would assure him he was doing everything within his power to secure his release and persuade the authorities to let Marie-José visit him. Moumbaris grew cynical about these claims but continued to see him as it was another visit from an outsider, and he could ask him questions about France. He afterwards said the prison was "luxury" compared to French prison.

He and Jenkin carried out a first trial run of the escape plan, and were involved in a couple of scrapes which nearly led to discovery in the lead-up to the escape. Both of them and Lee felt throughout the sooner they got out, the less the chances of being discovered; the others warned against impatience but agreed the participants should as far as possible be in control.

=== Escape ===
On 11 December 1979 the three escapees managed to execute their master plan, against all odds, and made it outside the prison wearing civilian clothes. Lee, having many friends in Johannesburg, thought it best to contact them in the first instance, so the group split at that point, making plans to meet in London. Moumbaris and Jenkin, by a variety of means, travelled overland to Swaziland and went to United Nations High Commission for Refugees, who were sympathetic to their plight and took them to an ANC representative. Thence to Mozambique, and, via contact with FRELIMO, to Angola, where from the ANC office in Luanda they were able to make phone calls to their families, and were also given the news Lee was on his way to join them at the airport.

On 30 December they were flown to Zambia, where they were accommodated under armed guard in Lusaka and their presence was officially announced by the ANC in early January 1980. Here they met Oliver Tambo and Alfred Nzo, President and Secretary-General of the ANC respectively, and gave a press conference on 2 January 1980.

From there they were flown to Dar-es-Salaam in Tanzania, accompanied by MK commander, Joe Modise. On 9 January Moumbaris left for France and was welcomed upon arrival in Paris by Marie-José (whom he had not seen for seven years), his mother, 7-year-old son Boris, and many friends and well-wishers.

=== Life after prison ===
By escaping, Moumbaris had reduced his sentence by five and a half years. Two years later, Marie-José gave birth to a daughter, Zoë, who was born on 11 December 1981, the second anniversary of the escape.

In Paris, Moumbaris organised the opening of the ANC office in 1981 and continued to assist the struggle against apartheid in various ways, including recruiting comrades for missions in South Africa for MK. With bills to pay, he took a job as computer specialist with a subsidiary of the Société Générale and became a shop steward for the Confédération Générale du Travail (CGT). In the 1990s he and others created an association dedicated to the memory of Joseph Stalin, later dissolved but re-formed, for his role in creating socialism, with free health and education.

In March 1988, Moumbaris was at the side of ANC Chief Representative Dulcie September in 1988 when she was shot and killed outside the office in Paris.

In May 2011, Moumbaris was charged with making a "Public call to discrimination" and set to appear in court in Flers, in Normandy. He was accused of having published, in the Press Newsletter (BIP), the article "Boycott Divestment Sanctions (BDS) 2010", summing up the activities and successes of the BDS campaign during 2010. The French Communist Party published a press release in his support on 20 May 2011.

Commenting on the 2017 French election, Moumbaris named François Asselineau as his favourite candidate, but he would vote for Marine Le Pen rather than Emmanuel Macron, purely based on protection of the nation against Macron's "financial fascism", but was still a staunch communist.

Moumbaris was still living in Normandy as of July 2017. In June 2018, he was received by South African ambassador Rapu Molekane at the embassy in Paris.

== Recognition ==
- 2012 - Sabotage Campaign Medal
- 2014 - Order of the Companions of OR Tambo, Silver, "For his excellent contribution in the struggle for liberation".

== In TV and film ==
In 2013, the story of the prison escape was dramatised in the 7th episode of the 2nd season of Breakout, a television series made by National Geographic TV channel dramatising real-life prison escapes. The video features excerpts from interviews with Moumbaris, Jenkin, Lee and fellow inmate Denis Goldberg filmed in 2012, in between re-enacted scenes of the prison escape.

In May 2017, it was announced production would start on a film of Jenkin's book, produced by David Barron and starring Daniel Radcliffe as Jenkin and Ian Hart as Goldberg. Filming of Escape from Pretoria began in Adelaide, South Australia, in March 2019, with Daniel Webber joining the cast as Lee. Moumbaris is renamed Leonard Fontaine and played by Mark Leonard Winter.
