= Looksmart Ngudle =

South African politician (1922-1963)

Looksmart Khulile Ngudle (22 May 1922 – 5 September 1963) was a South African politician. He was a member of the African National Congress (ANC) and South African Communist Party (SACP), an Umkhonto we Sizwe (MK) Commander and South African Congress of Trade Unions (SACTU) leader in the Western Cape. Ngudle's death is controversial, as he was the first person to die in detention during South Africa's Apartheid Era.

== Life before political activity ==
Ngudle was born on 22 May 1922 in KwaZali village, near Alice in the Eastern Cape. He attended Falconer High until Standard Six. He ended school early because he left to work on the mines in Johannesburg.

Ngudle worked at the Crown Mines goldmine for two years before returning to his home village to take part in the traditional circumcision ceremony. It was during this time that he met his future wife, Beauty. To raise enough money to marry her, Ngudle left Beauty and went to Cape Town in the Western Cape to look for work.

After gathering enough money to pay lobola, the couple married in the local Presbyterian Church. Together they had six children. In order to support his family Ngudle returned to Cape Town.

== Political history ==
During the 1940s and 1950s Ngudle saw bulldozers demolished black-owned homes in Kensington, Cape Town, to make way for a White-only neighbourhood. It was at this time, during the 1950s, that Ngudle joined the African National Congress (ANC).

Ngudle's obligation was to raise funds. The funds were used for when ANC members were arrested and required a lawyer. He would often stage large jazz concerts with the local choir and musicians. During this time in order to still send support to his family, he partook in the making and selling of leftist newspapers such as Fighting Talk and New Age.

In 1961, Ngudle joined the ANC's military division known as Umkhonto we Sizwe, and became a commander for MK. Denis Goldberg and Ngudle started a training camp in Mamre, Western Cape, where they trained various MK recruits how to: march, read a compass, perform first aid and make electrical circuits for bombs.

In May 1963, an order banning Ngudle from participating in political activities was issued and he was confined to the Wynberg Magisterial district in Cape Town.

== Arrest and detention ==
One night Ngudle assisted in organizing the logistics, transport and safe-houses for 20 ANC comrades who were being sent out of the country. During transport the group were arrested. Under interrogation one of the 20 members gave them the last address at which Ngudle had been staying.

Because he was in hiding Ngudle would have moved around a lot, barely staying at a fixed address for more than three days at a time. During the process of the 20 ANC members transportation Ngudle had fallen gravely ill and was at the address provided to the security police for an extended period of time.

On Monday 19 August 1963, Ngudle was arrested. While he was at Caledon Square police station he was badly tortured. Around 23–24 August 1963 he arrived at Pretoria Central Prison.

== Death ==
On 5 September 1963, Ngudle died; he was the first person to die in detention. The Special Branch stated that Ngudle committed suicide and he had hanged himself using his pyjamas. To prevent investigations into his treatment during arrest and life at the prison, four days after his death the state banned him. Ngudle was the first person to be banned post-mortem.
