= 1995 HM Prison Parkhurst escape =

Prison escape on the Isle of Wight, England

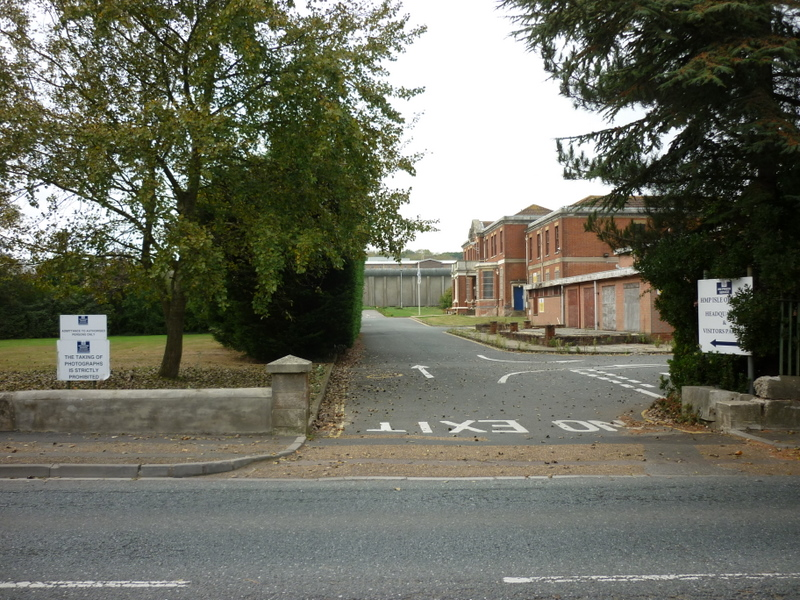
- Entrance to HM Prison Parkhurst
- Date: 3–7 January 1995
- Time: c. 17:45 GMT (3 January) – 21:00 GMT (7 January)
- Duration: 4 days
- Location: HM Prison Parkhurst, Isle of Wight, England, United Kingdom
- Type: Prison escape, manhunt
- Motive: Freedom
- Participants: Matthew Williams, Keith Rose and Andrew Rodger
- Outcome: Returned to prison
- Inquiries: Learmont Inquiry
- Arrests: 3
- Charges: Escape from lawful custody
- Convictions: Two-year imprisonment

The 1995 HM Prison Parkhurst escape took place on 3 January 1995, when three Category A prisoners, Matthew Williams, Keith Rose and Andrew Rodger, escaped from HM Prison Parkhurst on the Isle of Wight, England.

The group spent four days on the run, attempting to leave the island via both airplane and boat. However, this failed and the men were captured and returned to prison, receiving an additional two-year imprisonment for escaping lawful custody.

Prior to 1995, the last time a person had escaped from Parkhurst, was George Jackson, who, in 1946, was on the run for 11 days before being recaptured near the Hare and Houses pub in Downend. Another similar example of an escape involved Parkhurst prisoners in 1966, however, they escaped a prison transport bus, not the prison itself, while being returned to prison from court.

After the 1995 escape from Parkhurt, it would be another 17 years before another Category A prisoner escaped, when 31-year-old John Anslow was freed by three men armed with sledgehammers in January 2012.

== Background ==
=== HM Prison Parkhurst ===
At the time of the escape, HM Prison Parkhurst was a Category A prison with 100 prison officers guarding 200 inmates. The prison a bad reputation of being a violent prison. Prisoners there included those who had committed murders, including serial killers, as well as terror-related offenders. A former prison officer at the prison, Ian Jannaway, stated that Parkhurst was 'the end of the line' in terms of it being a prison which received: "Prisoners who were hard to control [and] prisoners who were problems to other staff or threat to other inmates."

=== Involved prisoners ===
==== Matthew Williams ====
Matthew Williams had been robbed whilst a microbiology and genetics student at the University of Leeds, Yorkshire and decided to seek revenge. In April 1989, having made an Improvised Explosive Device (IED) nail bomb, he placed it under a bench in Liverpool city centre, where the group who had robbed him hung out, attempting to injure them.

However, the police located the device and defused it, finding Williams was responsible. Williams was convicted of conspiracy to cause explosions, possessing an explosive substance, administering poison (having tried to poison his mother, having stolen enough cyanide to kill 300 people), as well as arson. He was sentenced to life imprisonment, receiving five discretionary life sentences. At trial, he was described as a: "gifted student who so hated the human race that he set out to destroy it." Having been convicted, he was transported to prison. At the time, Williams was unsure what prison he was being transported to, but worked out from the further south they were travelling, that it could only be one prison – HM Prison Parkhurst.

Comprehending the seriousness of having a life sentence and knowing that he could be in prison until he died, Williams had previously attempted to escape. He knew that the easiest way would be when he was in transit in a prison van. In 1994, Williams had concealed a hypodermic needle and, despite being handcuffed, managed to retrieve this from his trouser pocket. He stabbed himself several times in the arm, telling the prison guards that he had AIDS (this was a lie) and if they did not release his handcuffs, he would stab them with the now dirty needle. The driver, following procedure, raced to a local police station, where the door to the van was left open and Williams attempted to escape. However, police officers detained him.

Williams was described as having 'an air of menace', being described as a 'sociopath', who was 'extremely clever' and manipulative. He had previously dreamed of 'killing all mankind by germ warfare.' He was given the nickname 'psycho'.

Despite being 20 years younger than the other prisoners who escaped, Williams was the mastermind behind the plan.

==== Keith Rose ====
Rose, a man with no previous convictions until 1990, was a former computer company director, who had first been imprisoned that year having been sentenced to 15-years-imprisonment for two counts of kidnapping, having a firearm with intent to commit an indictable offence and blackmail. Having high levels of both debts related to his personal and business life, Rose, armed with a sawn-off shotgun and wearing combat clothing and a balaclava, forced entry into the home of a food wholesale's deputy chairman, Victor Cracknell, who was the son of food tycoon, Desmond Cracknell. Having entered the address, located near Guildford, Rose handcuffed Cracknell's wife to furniture, leaving a ransom note that demanded £1 million for her husband's release. He stated that if she attempted to contact police, he would execute her husband.

He led the deputy chairman to a secluded gully on Dartmoor, where the man, who was blindfolded, gagged and handcuffed, had a noose tied around his neck and a tree branch. Meanwhile, despite being warned against it by Rose, Cracknell's wife informed her husband's father, Desmond, who went to the police. Detectives imposed a news blackout, whilst Desmond negotiated a ransom fee with Rose during 96 hours of telephone conversations. Eventually, a reduced ransom was paid to Rose of £147,000. Cracknell was held for five days, trussed up in a sleeping bag with the noose around his neck, until he managed to free himself, staggering to a cottage after days of being out in the cold and rain. Police investigated and the majority of the money was located with Rose when he was arrested by officers from Surrey Police in Exeter, having been under police surveillance.

Having been arrested, police reopened an investigation into the wife of a wealthy supermarket owner, Juliet Rowe, who had been murdered in 1981 in Budleigh Salterton, Devon, during a botched kidnapping. As the victim attempted to resist the kidnap, she was shot four times in her back as she fled, with another two shots fired at point-blank range into her head and heart. Despite denying his involvement in this offence, he was convicted of the murder and sentenced to life imprisonment.

Rose was described by a prison guard as being 'polite', presenting 'well' to staff, focusing his attention on attending education classes within the prison. Rose and Williams knew one another, having served imprisonment at a different prison. Williams considered him trustworthy.

==== Andrew Rodger ====
On 1 June 1986, Rodger had been caught stealing from a vending machine at Ilford swimming baths by nightwatchman John Garrett. Having been caught, Rodger "went berserk", bludgeoning Garrett with a crowbar in a locker room, killing him. He was convicted of murder and sentenced to life-imprisonment, with a minimum term of 19-years-imprisonment.

Rodger was reportedly an abnormally strong prisoner, who was known for bending the doors of cells and his iron bed.

== Planning the escape ==
Immediately on his arrival, Williams started to think of ways out of the prison. He knew that he had to get past guards and CCTV cameras, over a 20 ft steel fence adorned with razor wire on the top, followed by a 24 ft wall that had a dome built onto the top to stop grappling hooks or similar items being attached. Furthermore, Williams understood that there was another difficulty of getting from the prison, located on an island, to the mainland.

At the time, construction work was being completed at the prison. Lorries and diggers drove up and down inside the prison itself, providing a way for a potential exit out of the prison.

Rose and Williams started talking about possibly escaping from the prison. Rose stated that he had been watching the guards and locks, noticing that a recent lock change had led to them being changed to colour-coded locks. Some of the locks were green, whilst others were red. It was noticed that not many of the locks in the prison were of the green colour-code, but lots of others were of the red colour-code.

Williams spent a day or two simply walking around the prison, seeing how if he was able to access a red key, he could access approximately 95% of the prison, including the vehicle compound. Williams thought that if he could access and hide himself using a vehicle, he could escape.

Discussions between Rose and Williams about the escape became serious. Rose stated that all they needed to concentrate on was making a shaped piece of metal that could work like a key. Convincing Williams of his ability to make an improvised key, Williams applied for a metalwork course in the workshop. This allowed him to have access to the tools and materials he needed to make a key.

Within the music room, there was a door with a red colour-code lock, which allowed Williams to surreptitiously study how it worked, in order to develop a key. However, the more he looked at the lock, the more complicated he found it was. Inadvertently, some of the information about how the lock worked was through observing the guard's keys.

Within the workshop, Williams was able to create a rough design for the key. However, the intricacies of the key would take longer and therefore could not be done within the workshop without raising suspicion. Williams therefore completed this work within his cell, having secreted the key. Williams knew he was faced with a very laborious task, whilst having to be careful about the noise he was making, noting that there was no excuse if he was to be found with a key on his person.

Over several weeks, Williams made slow but steady progress in shaping the key for the red colour-code locks. Williams found that the music room, where he had studied the locking mechanism, was the perfect place to test the key, due to staff and prisoners leaving the room altogether for a tea break during the lesson. On one of these occasions, Williams tested the key, finding it fitted perfectly, however, the key bent. Attempting to take the key out of the lock, Williams found it was stuck and desperately attempted to remove it before a guard returned to the room.

Williams was not able to remove the key, as guards entered and exited the room, all the while, being oblivious to the improvised key being stuck in the door. When people left the room, Williams attempted and successfully removed the key.

Williams made modifications to the key design, remaking it with steel, a much stronger metal. He found difficulty in attempting to cut through the steel with an inch-long piece of hacksaw that he had in his cell. Over a week or so, Williams developed the second key, before again going to the music room and trying the key.

On this occasion, the key was successful in opening the door, leaving Williams feeling 'pretty elated', knowing the access to the prison he had just given himself.

However, Williams' escape plan was interrupted, when a rumour emerged that prisoners were planning to steal a digger or lorry and attempt an escape from the building compound, similar to Williams' plan. As a result, security at the prison was upgraded and Williams and Rose had to discuss what they would do as a result of this development.

The pair thought as to how else they could use the key. Whilst knowing that many of the internal doors could be opened with the key, Williams was not sure which doors they were. In an attempt to discover this, Williams built a mental map of the prison, identifying the areas he knew that the key could open and where they led. He found that these areas led to the prison yard. However, there was still the issue of the interior fence and exterior wall to scale.

Williams found the only realistic approach was to build a ladder to scale the fence and wall. He thought that this was impossible, but realised that the ladder could be constructed during classes in the metal workshop, that could be hidden within the workshop in various parts. He and Rose began to create a ladder under the guise of it being an abstract art piece of a snake. He thought that he could then go to the workshop during the night using the key he'd made, assemble the ladder and take tools, before cutting through the fence and scaling the wall.

However, Williams had been banned from the metal workshop, having fallen out with the instructor over some sculptures he had been making and his attitude. As a result, Williams knew that he needed to recruit another person into the escape attempt.

Williams found there was only one person who was reliable and fitted the bill, who was Andrew Rodger. Convicted of murder and having served eight years of a 19-year sentence, Rodger was also determined to escape. Rodger was a workshop orderly, a trusted position that allowed him to have access to everything within the workshop. As a strong man, he would also be useful to assist in carrying the heavy ladder.

Whilst in the workshop, Rodger blended in well, as staff assumed he was working on various items that were required for the prison and he was never questioned about what work he was doing. He continued the abstract design of the snake, continuing to hide the fact it would be used as a ladder. The ladder that Rodger made consisted of lengths of central heating pipes, that were connected together to make the ladder. It took Rodger approximately 3 weeks to make and then hide in parts around the workshop.

The trio agreed that their escape should start at the gym, as it was the part of the prison with the weakest security. The only issue was there being a third gate that Williams and the others were not sure could be opened by the improvised key, as it had not been tested.

However, Rodgers discovered that the workshop at the prison was going to be relocated, meaning it could no longer be accessed, with the new site in an area with different locks. This setback would have required the making of new improvised keys. Williams knew that the trio had to move as fast as possible whilst they still had access to the workshop. It was decided that the escape plan would be brought into action that night.

== Escape ==
On 3 January 1995, having planned to start their escape from the gym, the trio met there during the evening's exercise hour. Within the gym were seven other prisoners. The plan was for Williams to run ahead of Rose and Rodgers, unlock all the gates, before returning to the gym, with the pair running to the workshop, followed by Williams, locking the gates behind them. Knowing there would be a roll-call in 30 minutes, the plan was brought into action.

Checking the coast was clear, Williams exited the gym, making his attempt to unlock all the gates. Having got to the gate that they had not tested, the lock initially would not open, before Williams managed to get it to work. Williams ran back to the gym, where Rose and Rodgers were waiting to go. With other prisoners starting a fight, this distracted the guards, allowing the trio to hide within the gym. At 17:45 GMT, the instructor locked the gym, with the trio still inside; it was not noticed by staff that the group of ten that had started in the gym had now reduced to seven. This meant that there was just over two hours until the next roll-call. The trio put their plan into action, heading towards the metal workshop to collect their ladder, leaving the gym and going towards the yard.

Williams knew that guards monitoring CCTV could spot the trio and stop their escape. As the group approached the workshop, they heard a rattle of keys, with a guard and a dog walking onto the yard. Approximately 20 ft away from Williams, the dog ran in front of him, looking towards him. Williams thought it was the end, however, the handler called for his dog, with the pair returning inside the prison.

Progressing into the workshop, Rodgers began assembling the ladder he'd made, with Williams taking wire cutters and electrical flex that they could use to lower themselves over the other side of the wall. After approximately 10 minutes, Rodgers had finished building the ladder and the group exited the workshop to the yard.

The group cut through the fence with the wire cutters, which did not have any alarms installed on it, placing the improvised ladder against the wall. The ladder had been unable to be tested, so Williams was unsure how much weight it would be able to take. Climbing it first, Williams reached the top of the wall, quickly lashing the portion of electrical flex to the ladder. As Rodgers climbed the ladder, Williams prepared to abseil down the other side of the wall, followed by Rodgers and Rose.

The next stage of the attempt was to leave the island. The men walked to Newport, with Rose explaining that he had a pilot's license and that there were three airfields located on the island.

The group's next objective was to locate a car and take it to Sandown Airfield, where Rose would 'hotwire' an aircraft and the group would fly across to France.

Rose suggested the group got a taxi, however, Williams thought this was not a good idea. However, Rose explained that to members of the public, the group appeared like everyone else, it made sense to get a taxi to get them further away from the prison and continue their escape attempt. The group used a local telephone kiosk, picking up a taxi. In terms of money, Williams later recalled how the group had previously smuggled it into the prison, however, staff believed that cash was left at the telephone kiosk by a fourth individual, involved in assisting the trio with the escape, although this person has never been identified.

The taxi took the trio nine miles to Sandown, where the group made it to the airfield on the other side of the island. They found just one nightwatchman and the airfield covered in darkness. Williams knew they could not let the nightwatchman see them, with it being considered suspicious for the group to be there at that time of night.

Rose got into one of the aircraft, performing some checks, but discovered there was no battery in the aircraft, meaning they could not fly. On checking another aircraft, the lock to the ignition was complicated and despite attempting to bypass it, the group decided to abandon the aircraft idea, instead opting to attempt to leave the island via boat.

For the following four days, the group attempted to steal an aircraft and several boats.

Having left the airfield, the men walked for approximately four to five hours, and having not had anything to eat or drink for approximately 12 hours, were exhausted. They discovered an abandoned shed in which they took shelter in under a large plastic sheet to protect them from the freezing wind. Whilst in the shed, Rose shaved his beard off with a shaving kit that Williams had taken with him when leaving the prison, to which Williams recalled made Rose look completely different, to a stage that he did not recognise him.

Having concealed his identity, Rose left the shed and went out to buy provisions, with the group agreeing that if he did not return within 90 minutes, it would be assumed that he had been captured and that Williams and Rodgers would leave the shed and move on. This was because Williams worried that if Rose was to be captured, police would not take long to search the nearby area, locating him and Rodgers as well. Williams worried that the police could locate them 'at any time.'

Williams found that Rose and Rodgers were becoming increasingly anxious about wanting to leave the shed to another location, whereas Williams thought that the longer they waited, the better the chances they had when they attempted to locate a boat. Rose suggested calling a friend of his on the mainland, who may be able to smuggle the men off in the back of a van, but Williams did not like the idea, telling Rose not to call anyone.

Rose left the shed again to get supplies, however, on returning, he informed Rodgers and Williams that he had called his friend, which made Williams furious. Williams decided that the group needed to leave the shed immediately and get off of the island via a boat from the marina.

At one stage, the group were hiding out in a shed in a garden in a busy area of Ryde. They stayed here for four days. The woman who owned the house was none the wiser that the trio were in her shed, with them leaving at some stage to get fish and chips from a local shop, situated just 50 yards from the police station.

As the group left the shed on day 5, thinking the manhunt would have been scaled down, they decided to make a break for the ferry. The group split, with Rose and Rodgers walking together ahead and Williams walking behind on his own, in order to increase their chances of escaping if police were to stop either group.

== The alarm is raised and searches commence ==
A prison dog handler located a hole that had been cut in the fence. This led to a roll-call being conducted to establish who was missing. By this time, the escaped prisoners had been on the run for two-and-a-half-hours, unbeknown to the escaped prisoners, who, if they had known that information, would have been able to board a ferry and leave the island undetected, before police were even aware they had escaped lawful custody.

Shortly after 20:00, the alarm was raised. Assistant Chief Constable John Wright of Hampshire Constabulary was alerted to the prison escape via a phone call. ACC Wright was aware that anyone who escaped from the prison was likely to be very dangerous, with this heightened by there being three escapees.

ACC Wright gave immediate instructions that 250 officers would be mobilised to the Isle of Wight, including armed officers, to the ferry ports, to conduct a systematic search and place a 'ring of steel' around the island. ACC Wright later described how the Isle of Wight became a 'mini Alcatraz', with the prisoners escaping the prison, but still being stuck on the island. However, ACC Wright knew that despite this, it would still be searching for a needle within a haystack.

A code phrase was issued, alerting officers to go to their nearest police station. This included PC John Lyness, with him and colleagues being provided a quick briefing as to the incident. On hearing that two of the prisoners who had escaped had been convicted of murder, PC Lyness knew that they had 'nothing to lose'. ACC Wright had a similar concern, that the prisoners could take hostages. Each time police searched a property, they had to ensure that it had been thoroughly searched and that people within the household were not being held against their will.

Police searched a number of isolated addresses and empty buildings within the countryside near to the prison. They also asked people whether they had seen anything suspicious. The alarm of one address had been set off, with PC Lyness and others attending, wondering whether the escaped prisoners were inside, however, it turned out to be a false alarm.

Having scoured the island for five days, police had failed to locate the prisoners.

PC Lyness, accompanied by SC Mike Carr, were later given responsibility to take a patrol of the island. An off-duty prison officer, Colin Jones, flagged down a passing police motorcyclist at 19:20 GMT, telling them that whilst driving on Lushington Hill, near to Wootton, approximately 2 miles from the prison, he had seen three men that he recognised. Officers, including PC Lyness and SC Carr attended the area, where they noticed two men walking with their heads down. On stopping ahead of them, they scattered, with Rose and Rodgers being detained at approximately 19:30 GMT, offering no resistance. They explained to police they thought the search had been called off, as Williams fled on his own, going through a hedgerow and cross country.

PC Lyness later recalled how he thought Rose believed he had a gun, saying to PC Lyness: "Please! Don't shoot, don't shoot!", having dropped to his knees and put his hands in front of himself. PC Lyness knew that dog handlers would be en route to his location, with him also requesting the police helicopter attend, to utilise their thermal-imaging capability to try and find Williams.

With Rose and Rodgers having been captured, Williams focused on running, telling himself to keep going. Williams made it to a marina at Island Harbour, near East Cowes, locating several boats. One boat had a small dingy attached to the back, which Williams attempted to untie. As he was doing so, he noticed torches coming towards him and Williams struggled to undo the frozen ropes. One of these officers was PC Tony Woolcock, a dog handler, who had responded to PC Lyness' call over the radio and deployed his dog. His dog picked up a scent, which was followed in the direction of the marina. However, the search was heightened by the belief that Williams was armed with a home-made pistol, as Rose and Rodger had told police that was the case, with Williams also having 12 rounds of ammunition.

Williams noticed a very bright light over the trees, heading towards him, followed by 'the distinctive sound of a helicopter.' Williams was aware of the capability the aircraft had with the thermal imaging camera. Knowing that it would pick up his body heat, Williams entered the water, which was freezing cold, being a physical shock to Williams, who given the immersion in the water, lost his hearing and eyesight and could not feel his arms or legs. He hoped that the helicopter would do a sweep of the area, before going further up the coast, allowing for Williams to then get out the water and move on.

The helicopter moved on, with Williams emerging from the water and hoping that the low temperature of his body would mean that thermal imaging would not detect him. Having climbed out of the water, Williams' hearing had gone and he could only see a short distance in front of him.

Just after 21:00 GMT, PC Woolcock's colleague, who was stood with him at the marina, noticed a person move, spotting Williams. Williams jumped back into the water, with PC Woolcock following him, where he detained Williams on mud flats, stopping him from swimming across the River Medina. PC Woolcock later recalled how Williams looked like 'a hunted animal', and Williams had 'completely given in'. From having run off from when Rose and Rodger were detained, Williams had been on the run for a further 90 minutes.

PC Woolcock, was interviewed by the press, telling them: "I grabbed hold of the guy, turned him. I was concerned where his hands were, pushed him to the bank, made sure his hands were in sight at all times, held him there. Jim [a colleague] passed me some handcuffs, pulled his arms around, we handcuffed and then dragged him out of the water. But, it was good, it was a nice feeling, we got a guy who needs to be caught."

== Legal proceedings ==
Williams was returned to prison on the evening of Sunday 8 January, being put into solitary confinement. His hearing and sight returned quickly, however, for a few days after, Williams was quite ill. Rose and Rodgers were detained at Newport police station, before later being returned to the prison.

They were all given an additional two-year imprisonment for the escape.

== Aftermath ==
=== Learmont Inquiry ===
Following the escape, as well as another escape in September 1994 of six exceptional risk Category A prisoners from HM Prison Whitemoor, Cambridgeshire, Baroness Emily Blatch commissioned an inquiry to be led by General Sir John Learmont.

The inquiry found that the prisoners had escaped due to security that was loose and ineffective. It added that the hunt to find them was 'chaos', with no-one knowing who should be called to assist, radios and torches not having charged batteries and maps being illegible due to poor photocopies. The report added: "The break-out could have been launched at any time with the same chances of success. There is little to commend in the way things were done."

Alarmingly, the report found how 'a phoney stability was achieved at Parkhurst...by surrender to the prisoners of control over their daily existence.' The report suggested that the prison was being run by the inmates, noting bullying and intimidation being 'rife'. Phonecards were used as currency for gambling and drugs. There was not any limit to how much cash prisoners held. The latter point was revealed further, when 20 prisoners were transferred to different prisons after the escape, which found the private cash balance dropped within the prison by nearly £15,000.

On the night of the escape, the guards who were meant to be monitoring cameras were untrained and distracted by other responsibilities. It was found the governor spent only 'two or three hours a week talking to staff and inmates' and '50 [hours]' on paperwork.

The report found that there were areas of the prison that were not covered by CCTV, such as the waiting area for visitors, meaning illicit items could be brought in. It was found that officers themselves knew that in the 'confusion and noise', contraband was regularly passed between inmates, with it being suggested that staff may have brought in illicit items as well.

Weaknesses in the security were also blamed on the continual building work at the prison, with Parkhurst originally being built in the Victorian era. Work that had begun in 1988 and should have been finalised by 1993 was not, with staff resisting the prison temporarily closing in order not to lose their jobs.

The report also revealed that one of the prisoners, who was a qualified sheet metal-worker, had been left alone and unsupervised to make the ladder.

==== HM Prison Parkhurst ====
The prison service admitted that the escape was likely due to a failure of basic security procedures being followed. Despite the trio being captured quickly, it was said that the incident led to the Prison Service facing 'gross public humiliation.' Authorities later spent £1.2 million upgrading security at the prison. Ultimately, the prison escape led to Parkhurst losing its maximum security prison, being downgraded to a Category B prison.

==== Williams ====
After escaping, Williams called for prison reform, writing to the editor of his hometown newspaper, the Wirral Globe.

In June 2001, Williams lost a High Court appeal against a decision in September 2000, that stated his security rating should remain at Category A. Despite referring to a Parole Board view in March 2000 that there was justification to decrease Williams' security category, a committee deemed Williams still posed a high escape risk, shown by his 1995 escape that caused "opprobrium" on the Prison Service. At that time, he was imprisoned at HM Prison Frankland, County Durham.

Williams served 16-years-imprisonment after the escape, being released in 2011.

==== Rodger ====
Rodger was released on license from prison in 2006, moving to Garelochhead, Scotland. Moving there, Rodger worked as a handyman. On 14 August 2018 Rodger was arrested for acting aggressively and attempting strike an off-duty Ministry of Defence police officer, during a road rage incident. He was sentenced to a community payback order with two years of supervision, as well as 250 hours of unpaid work.

==== Rose ====
As of 2017, Rose, now 68-years-old, was still imprisoned. He had won a Judicial Review against the Secretary of State for Justice regarding his Category A status on 31 August, with the panel finding that his prisoner category should be immediately downgraded to Category B. At that time, Rose was imprisoned at HM Prison Whitemoor, Cambridgeshire.

=== Later escape attempts ===
In 2009, HM Prison Parkhurst was merged with HM Prison Albany and HM Prison Camp Hill to create the super prison, HM Prison Isle of Wight. Despite the merger, escapes from HM Prison Parkhurst have continued to be attempted.

==== 2010 ====
In 2010, another prison escape from Parkhurst was foiled. Inmate Brian Lawrence, aged 67, was serving life imprisonment, with a minimum term of 21-years-imprisonment, having been convicted in October 2005 of murdering the friend of an ex-lover and planning two further murders. Using lemon juice as invisible ink and hiding codes within sudoku puzzles to communicate with accomplices, Lawrence had given instructions that were encrypted, such as a plan to bring a helicopter to the part of the prison that was not covered by protective netting, which he would escape in and flee to Spain. The ongoing Isle of Wight Festival would act as cover, with there being less suspicion due to air traffic associated with the festival. The plot was going to be funded by the sale of a Newbury quarry. When the plot was uncovered, Lawrence was transferred to a different prison.

==== 2014 ====
In 2014, a plan by an inmate to take a prison officer hostage and escape the prison was foiled by officers, after they conducted cell searches in October of that year. Intelligence had been received by the Ministry of Justice, leading to a search of a cell of an unnamed inmate, where detailed escape plans involving kidnapping were located. The prisoner was moved into the close supervision unit whilst an urgent probe was launched.

== See also ==
- Ronnie Biggs (one of the Great Train Robbers, who escaped from prison and spent 36 years on the run)
- George Blake (an MI6 agent acting as a double-agent for the Soviet Union, who escaped from prison in 1966, living in Russia until his death in 2020)
- The Maidstone Prison Escape (seven members of the Provisional Irish Republican Army (IRA) escaped from a floating prison on a former warship)
- The Maze Prison Escape (the biggest prison escape in UK history, where 38 Provisional IRA prisoners escaped from a block of the prison)
- HM Prison Pentonville Escape (2016) (two prisoners escaped from the prison, using smuggled diamond-tipped cutting tools)
