= Sandra Smith (criminal) =

Last woman executed by hanging in South Africa

Sandra Smith (c. 1965 – 2 June 1989) was a South African woman condemned to death by hanging in 1986, alongside her boyfriend, Yassiem Harris, for the murder of 16-year-old Jermaine Abrahams during a robbery. She was the last known woman executed in the country at Pretoria Central Prison, Pretoria. In November 1989, president F W de Klerk ordered a nationwide moratorium, stopping executions until further notice. In S v Makwanyane in 1995, the Constitutional Court of South Africa declared that capital punishment be abolished, being incompatible with the provisional constitution of 1993.
