= Daniel Webber (actor) =

Australian actor (born 1988)

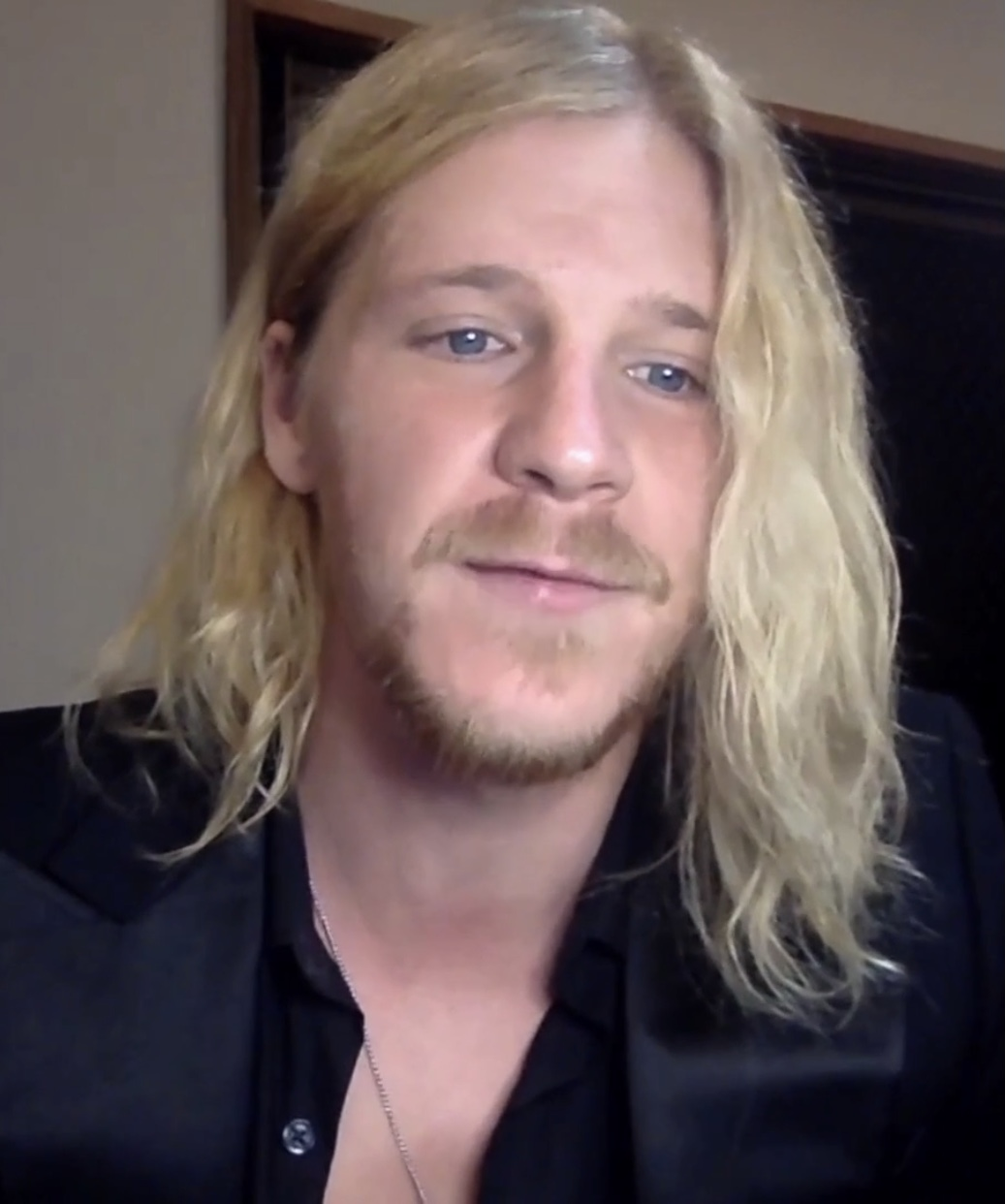
- Webber in 2022
- Born: 28 June 1988 (age 38); Gosford, New South Wales, Australia
- Occupation: Actor
- Years active: 2008–present

Daniel Peter Webber (born 28 June 1988) is an Australian actor. Among his best known roles, Webber has portrayed Mötley Crüe lead singer Vince Neil in the 2019 film The Dirt, Lee Harvey Oswald in the American science fiction thriller miniseries 11.22.63 and Lewis Wilson in the series The Punisher.

== Early life and education ==
Webber grew up on the New South Wales Central Coast and attended Green Point Christian College. He was a trampolinist and performed in the 2000 Summer Olympics closing ceremony.

== Career ==
Webber worked as a rope access technician on wind turbines. His first acting experience was on the 2009 film The Combination. From 2009–2010, he portrayed Darius Pike on the TV series K-9. He also had roles on All Saints and in the miniseries Devil's Dust.

In 2015, Webber played Ryan Kelly, a stalker, on Australian soap opera Home and Away.

Webber's role on the J. J. Abrams-produced 11.22.63 was his first in the United States. He got the role after sending in an audition tape, which he had two days to prepare for, including watching newsreels of Oswald and listening to clips of his voice. After he was cast, he then read the novel on which it was based, as well as other books about the assassination. Webber received praise for "mastering Oswald's peculiar speech pattern and growing sense of paranoia."

In 2016, he starred alongside Lena Headey and fellow Australian Eliza Taylor in the police drama film Thumper.

Webber played a distraught United States Army veteran who has PTSD in the Netflix television series The Punisher.

In 2019, Webber portrayed Mötley Crüe lead singer Vince Neil in the 2019 Netflix film The Dirt. He also appeared in the feature film Danger Close: The Battle of Long Tan, directed by Kriv Stenders.

== Filmography ==
=== Film ===
Year	Title	Role	Notes
2009	The Combination	Jason	
2009	Multiple Choice	Andy	Short film
2011	Sleeping Beauty	Spy Shop Assistant	
2012	The Girl Who Lived	Caspar	
2012	Reason to Smile	Jake	Short film
2012	Baseheart	Boy	Short film
2013	Galore	Shane	
2013	Deceit	Xavier Thornton	
2013	Break	Liam	Short film
2013	Spine	Wayne	Short film
2014	Eric	Eric	Short film
2015	Skin	Luke	Short film
2015	Summer Nights	Indy	Short film
2016	Teenage Kicks	Dan O'Connel	
2016	All Night Gaming	Will	
2017	Thumper	Beaver	
2017	Australia Day	Jason Patterson	
2019	The Dirt	Vince Neil	
2019	Danger Close: The Battle of Long Tan	Private Paul Large	
2020	Escape from Pretoria	Stephen Lee	
2022	Seriously Red	Kenny	
2024	Furiosa: A Mad Max Saga	War Boy	
2026	War Machine	57	
TBA	The Entertainment System Is Down	TBA	Post-production

=== Television ===
Year	Title	Role	Notes
2008	All Saints	Kieran Foster	Episode: "Training Wheels"
2009–2010	K9	Darius Pike	26 episodes
2012	Devil's Dust	Young Guy	Miniseries, 2 episodes
2015	Home and Away	Ryan Kelly	Soap opera, 9 episodes
2016	11.22.63	Lee Harvey Oswald	Miniseries, 7 episodes
2017	The Punisher	Lewis Wilson	7 episodes
2022–2025	Billy the Kid	Jesse Evans	14 episodes
2023	Caught	Jason	Episode: "Blue Check Mark"
