= Stephen Lee (South African activist) =

South African former political prisoner (born 1951)

- Born: Stephen Bernard Lee c. 1951 (age 74–75); Cape Town, South Africa
- Education: University of Cape Town
- Occupations: Sociologist, activist
- Known for: Prison escape, anti-apartheid activism

Stephen Bernard Lee (born c. 1951) is a South African former political prisoner best known for his 1979 escape from Pretoria Local Prison (part of the Pretoria Central Prison complex) with friend and fellow activist Tim Jenkin and a third inmate, Alex Moumbaris.

== Biography ==
=== Early life and activism ===
Lee was born in South Africa. After developing an interest in Marxism and involving himself in left-leaning student politics at the University of Cape Town and subsequently switching courses from business science to sociology in 1971, he met Jenkin in a sociology class. They soon became friends and both of them sought out the literature banned by the apartheid government, devouring, photocopying it and swapping it with other students. They both found their sociology course disappointing, as the material reinforced the status quo of the apartheid system.

As they started realising the full extent of the unfair system of apartheid, they were fired with a desire to work towards change. Coming to the conclusion they could not effect any real change within the constitutional framework, which banned all effective and truly democratic opposition, they decided the ideals of the African National Congress (ANC) were worth fighting for. The only way they could work for this banned organisation was to move to the UK and make contact with the organisation there, so both set off in February 1974 by ship via Barcelona, spending a few weeks in the Netherlands en route.

Upon arrival in London in April 1974, they applied to join the ANC. While the ANC were checking their credentials, Lee went and worked as a carpenter in the Netherlands and taught English in Spain. At the end of 1974, the ANC informed him they had been approved and, after receiving some months of training with them, could return to South Africa to do something for the movement. During this time Lee worked as a bus conductor and joined the Transport and General Workers' Union (TGWU).

After their return to Cape Town in July 1975, Lee and Jenkin bought a typewriter, duplicator and stationery to print and post pamphlets and leased first a garage and then a tiny apartment. In March 1976 Lee decided to go to Johannesburg to look for work, and the ANC coincidentally sent them both on their first mission, to disperse leaflets urging support for the ANC and unity in the liberation struggle via a leaflet bomb in Johannesburg, close to the anniversary of the Sharpeville Massacre. After achieving this mission, Lee worked for the University of the Witwatersrand, while Jenkin ran the "cell" on his own in Cape Town. Not long after the Soweto uprising, Lee planted a number of leaflet bombs around Johannesburg.

In December 1976, Lee went to Cape Town and both he and Jenkin planted leaflet bombs in the city and suburbs. In Jenkin's words, "The actual message on the leaflets, important as it was, was not as important as the fact the ANC had done it. It is because of the propaganda effect...".

In June 1977 Lee distributed several caches of leaflets at a right-wing sociology conference in Johannesburg. In September, he and Jenkin hung a 10-metre-long banner with the words "ANC LIVES" from a high building in the centre of Cape Town, along with a timed device which distributed hundreds of leaflets over the crowds below. Lee moved back to Cape Town in December after enrolling in a master's degree in sociology, and the two continued their undercover work, but unbeknownst to them they were by this time under surveillance by police.

=== Arrest ===
At 3am on 2 March 1978, they were both arrested, after being seen moving their printing equipment into their own dwelling.

They were separated, interrogated and put into cells, without being informed of the charges or their rights. This was legal under Section 6 of the Terrorism Act, which allowed detention without trial for up to 60 days, and was extendable. Lee made an escape attempt and nearly succeeded. After a spell in the notorious John Vorster Square in Johannesburg, they were returned to Cape Town and after four weeks, allowed to see family, and held at Pollsmoor Prison as they awaited trial. After Lee's father brought him a copy of the book Papillon, the book inspired them to seriously consider the prospect of escape and they concentrated on rigorous observations of the world around them.

=== Trial ===
Along with Jenkin, Lee was tried in the Cape Town Supreme Court from 6 to 15 June 1978, charged with helping to produce and distribute pamphlets for the ANC and South African Communist Party (SACP), and/or participating in ANC, SACP and Umkhonto we Sizwe (MK) (all banned organisations in apartheid South Africa) activities. They received poor legal advice and were not allowed to make their own pleas in answer to the charges. Lee's family had insisted on using a different defence lawyer, and he and his witnesses – parents, a Roman Catholic chaplain and a family friend – used the line Jenkin was the ringleader and Lee had been corrupted. Lee was sentenced to eight years' imprisonment and Jenkin to twelve.

=== Prison ===
They were first taken to Pretoria Central Prison for assessment, where they were assigned to Pretoria Local Prison (aka Pretoria Prison) to serve out their sentences. This was a separate prison, one of three along with Pretoria Central proper and "Maximum" or "Beverly Hills" which were part of the complex - although all three were often referred to mistakenly as Pretoria Central. Within this prison, they were assigned to the maximum security part reserved for white male political prisoners, making the number up to 11 at that time. From the first day, they were observing their surroundings and weighing up the chances of an escape.

=== Escape ===
Lee, Jenkin and Alex Moumbaris escaped from Pretoria Prison in 1979, after meticulous planning and trial runs. The escape is described in great detail by Jenkin's book, Escape from Pretoria (1987, 2003).

Although Jenkin and Moumbaris contributed most towards the preparations for and material necessities of the plan, Lee was firmly behind their thinking and assisted in whatever ways he could. After escaping, Lee separated for some weeks from the others, staying with friends in Johannesburg before meeting up with them again at Luanda airport to fly out of Angola.

=== Life after prison ===
Lee and Jenkin appeared at a press conference in Lusaka, Zambia with Oliver Tambo on 2 January 1980 to tell their stories. After flying to Tanzania, Lee flew on to London on 13 January 1980, having renounced his South African citizenship soon after arrival in Pretoria.

In May 1980, the warder who had been on duty of the night of the escape, Sergeant Vermeulen, was put on trial for aiding terrorists, or alternatively aiding in the escape of three prisoners. Lee, having first written to a newspaper explaining Vermeulen's innocence, upon request sent a sworn statement to his defence attorney stating this. The combination of this and the many inconsistencies in his forced confession led to his eventual acquittal.

Lee and Jenkin went on a speaking tour in Sweden in the early 1980s.

== In TV and film ==
In 2013, the story of the prison escape was dramatised in the 7th episode of the 2nd season of Breakout, a television series made by National Geographic TV channel dramatising real-life prison escapes. The video features excerpts from interviews with Jenkin, Lee, Moumbaris and Goldberg filmed in 2012, in between re-enacted scenes of the prison escape.

In May 2017, it was announced production would start on a film of Jenkin's book, produced by David Barron and starring Daniel Radcliffe as Jenkin and Ian Hart as Goldberg. Filming of Escape from Pretoria began in Adelaide, South Australia, in March 2019, with Daniel Webber joining the cast as Lee.

== Cited works ==
- Jenkin, Tim (1987). Escape from Pretoria (PDF). London: Kliptown. ISBN 9780904759778. OCLC 924674792.
