= Kgosi Mampuru prison =

Large prison in central Pretoria, South Africa

Pretoria Central Prison, renamed Kgosi Mampuru II Management Area by former President Jacob Zuma on 13 April 2013 and sometimes referred to as Kgosi Mampuru II Correctional Services, is a large prison in central Pretoria, within the City of Tshwane in South Africa. It is operated by the South African Department of Correctional Services.

The complex comprises six correctional centres, including the notorious C Max, Pretoria Local Prison, and a women's prison. The new name is the same as the street name (renamed in the previous year), with both now bearing the name of Kgosi Mampuru, a 19th-century local chief who resisted Boer rule and was subsequently hanged in 1883.

== History ==
=== 1948-1994: Apartheid era ===
During the apartheid years, the huge complex was often known incorrectly as "Pretoria Central". In fact, there were three separate clusters of prisons: Pretoria Central Prison proper, Pretoria (Local) Prison and a third known only as "Maximum" or "Beverley Hills". The latter was the ultra-maximum-security section. There were also housing and recreational facilities for the prison wardens. divided into separate prisons for males and females of different racial classifications. It was on what was then Potgieter Street, later renamed Kgosi Mampuru Street.

Pretoria Central Prison was the official site of capital punishment in South Africa during the apartheid era. Condemned prisoners were held in a section of the prison called "The Pot". At one time, the prison gallows could hang up to seven people at a time.

Pretoria Central proper consisted of a number of separate prison buildings, each housing various divisions of prisoners based on racial classification and gender. This was a national prison and reception centre where many prisoners started and ended their sentences.

Pretoria Prison, or Pretoria Local, housed local prisoners (split by race) as well as having a maximum-security section for white political prisoners (black political prisoners being held in Robben Island), recidivists, habitual escapees, and the condemned. The section housing the white male political prisoners was an L-shaped three-storey building built in the late 1960s, consisting of 52 cells. As of 1978, the maximum number housed had been 22, with the average about 10; for this reason, the remaining cells were occupied by prisoners awaiting trial. The inmates included Denis Goldberg (who had been sentenced at the Rivonia Trial with Nelson Mandela and other ANC leaders), Raymond Suttner, and Jeremy Cronin.

The old Pretoria Local Prison building was demolished around 1978 after other buildings had been built adjacent to it.

==== 1979 escape ====
In 1979 white political prisoners Tim Jenkin, Alex Moumbaris and Stephen Lee escaped from "the Local". After this escape, the building in which they had been held was completely refurbished with increased security features.

=== Post-apartheid ===
==== 2006: C Max escape ====
In November 2006 Annanias Mathe became the first prisoner to escape from the C Max part of the prison complex. He was recaptured two weeks after his escape.

=== 2013: renaming ===
The complex was renamed Kgosi Mampuru II Management Area by President Jacob Zuma on 13 April 2013.

=== 2017: riot ===
A prison warden and an inmate were injured during a prison riot in July 2017, after prisoners' concerns over delays in processing parole applications, poor food, overcrowding and violence by wardens were sent in a memorandum to the justice minister Michael Masutha, who had been Minister of Justice and Correctional Services since 2014.

== Composition ==
The complex comprises six correctional centres, and includes a women's prison and Pretoria Local Prison.

The remand centre is in the front of the facility. The supermax prison, now known as C Max and on the site of the former death row, is in the centre of the facility, on the lee of a hill.

=== C Max ===
C Max
- Interactive map of C Max
- Location: Pretoria, South Africa; 25.761°S 28.182°E
- Security class: Maximum
- Population: 100
- Managed by: Department of Correctional Services (South Africa)
- Warden: Zhile Mbiza

C Max is the maximum security division of the prison. It is run by the South African Department of Correctional Services. The division is specifically designed for violent and disruptive prisoners who have been classified as dangerous in terms of the South African Criminal Procedure Act. Prisoners are kept in solitary confinement for 23 hours of each day out and specialized equipment, such as electric shields, are used by the prison guards.

==== Prison escape ====
In November 2006, Annanias Mathe became the first person to escape from C Max. Mathe, who had extensive military training gained during the Mozambique civil war, is reported to have escaped by covering his body in Vaseline and squeezing through his tiny cell window 20 by 60 centimetres (8 by 24 in). Mathe had been detained on more than 50 charges, including murder, rape, armed robbery and hijacking. He was recaptured two weeks after his escape following a large manhunt.

== Notable inmates ==
- Alex Moumbaris - political prisoner who escaped in 1979.
- Bantu Steve Biko - anti-apartheid activist died here in 1977.
- Bram Fischer - lawyer and anti-apartheid activist who died of cancer in 1975 while serving a life sentence.
- Butana Almond Nofomela - former South African security policeman.
- Dave Kitson - anti-apartheid campaigner and Little Rivonia Trialist.
- Denis Goldberg - anti-apartheid campaigner and Rivonia Trialist.
- Dorethea van der Merwe - In 1921, the first woman to be hanged for murder; was hanged at Pretoria Central Prison.
- Daisy de Melker – In 1932, the second woman to be hanged for murder; was hanged at Pretoria Central Prison.
- Jeremy Cronin - writer, poet, and anti-apartheid activist.
- Jopie Fourie - Afrikaner nationalist, shot at Pretoria Central Prison for his role in the Maritz rebellion
- John Matthews - anti-apartheid campaigner and Little Rivonia Trialist.
- Looksmart Ngudle – political activist.
- Mike Hoare - mercenary charged with hijacking an Air India jet in an attempt at a coup in the Seychelles.
- Nelson Mandela - held in pre-trial cells in Pretoria Local (in cells no longer standing).
- Oscar Pistorius - sentenced to five years for culpable homicide on 21 October 2014, he was released on 19 October 2015. After his conviction was changed to murder in December 2015, Pistorius was sentenced to six years imprisonment on 6 July 2016. He left the prison in November 2016 after being transferred to the Atteridgeville Correction Centre.
- Raymond Suttner - academic, writer, and anti-apartheid activist.
- Solomon Ngobeni - the last person to be executed by the government of South Africa in 1989.
- Sandra Smith – South African woman sentenced to death for murder, the last woman to be executed in the country in 1989
- Solomon Kalushi Mahlangu - South African freedom fighter, struggle activist and operative of the African National Congress militant wing, Umkhonto we Sizwe (MK) hanged in 1979.
- Stephen Lee - political prisoner who escaped in 1979.
- Tim Jenkin - political prisoner who escaped in 1979.
- Vuyisile Mini - unionist, Umkhonto we Sizwe activist, singer and one of the first African National Congress members to be executed by apartheid South Africa in 1964.
- Andrew Zondo – a South African Umkhonto we Sizwe (MK) operative hanged in 1986.
- Winnie Madikizela-Mandela - anti-Apartheid activist.

=== C Max inmates ===
- Annanias Mathe - Serial rapist and robber.
- Clive Derby-Lewis - Assassin.
- Dimitri Tsafendas - Assassin.
- Eugene de Kock - Commanding officer of C10, a counter-insurgency unit of the South African Police which functioned as a death squad for the apartheid government.
- Janusz Waluś - Assassin.
- Moses Sithole - Serial killer and rapist.
- Radovan Krejčíř - Czech former billionaire; organized crime boss.
- Sipho Thwala - Serial killer and rapist.
- Thabo Bester - Serial rapist, murderer and prison escapee.
