= David Barron (film producer) =

British film producer

- Born: 21 February 1954 (age 72); Ipsden, South Oxfordshire, England
- Occupation: Film producer
- Spouse: Sheelagh Barron

David Barron (born 21 February 1954) is a British film producer, best known for his involvement in the Harry Potter film series.

== Career ==
Barron has worked in the entertainment industry for more than 25 years, beginning his career in commercials before moving into television and film production. He has held a wide range of posts, including location manager, assistant director, production manager and production supervisor, working on such films as The French Lieutenant's Woman, The Killing Fields, Revolution, Legend, The Princess Bride and Franco Zeffirelli's Hamlet.

In 1991, Barron was appointed executive in charge of production on George Lucas' ambitious television project The Young Indiana Jones Chronicles. The following year, he served as the line producer on the feature The Muppet Christmas Carol. In 1993, Barron joined Kenneth Branagh's production team as associate producer and unit production manager on Mary Shelley's Frankenstein. That film began an association with Branagh, with Barron going on to produce the director's films A Midwinter's Tale, Hamlet and Love's Labour's Lost. Barron also produced Oliver Parker's Othello, in which Branagh starred with Laurence Fishburne. In spring 1999, he formed his own company, Contagious Films, with British director Paul Weiland. Barron more recently launched Runaway Fridge Films and Beagle Pug Films.

He worked as a producer on Harry Potter and the Deathly Hallows – Part 1 and Part 2. He previously served as a producer on Harry Potter and the Half-Blood Prince and Harry Potter and the Order of the Phoenix. He was also an executive producer on both Harry Potter and the Chamber of Secrets and Harry Potter and the Goblet of Fire.

== Filmography ==
Producer

- Othello (1995)
- In the Bleak Midwinter (1995)
- Hamlet (1996)
- Love's Labours Lost (2000)
- Harry Potter and the Order of the Phoenix (2007)
- Harry Potter and the Half-Blood Prince (2009)
- Harry Potter and the Deathly Hallows – Part 1 (2010)
- Page Eight (2011)
- Harry Potter and the Deathly Hallows – Part 2 (2011)
- Jack Ryan: Shadow Recruit (2014)
- Frank (2014)
- Cinderella (2015)
- The Legend of Tarzan (2016)
- Breathe (2017)
- Terminal (2018)
- Mowgli: Legend of the Jungle (2018)
- Escape from Pretoria (2020)
- Emily (2022)

Executive producer

- It Was an Accident (2000)
- Possession (2002)
- Harry Potter and the Chamber of Secrets (2002)
- Harry Potter and the Goblet of Fire (2005)

Production supervisor

- Revolution (1985)
- The Princess Bride (1987)
- The Lonely Passion of Judith Hearne (1987)
- Strapless (1989)
- Nightbreed (1990)

Other credits

| Year | Title | Role |
|---|---|---|
| 1981 | The French Lieutenant's Woman | Location Manager |
| 1984 | The Killing Fields | 2nd Assistant Director |
| 1985 | Legend | Unit Manager |
| 1992 | The Muppet Christmas Carol | Line Producer |
| 1994 | Mary Shelly's Frankenstein | Associate Producer and Unit Production Manager |
| 2005 | Sahara | Co-Producer |
