= Beacon Royal =

Coordinates: 26°10′43″S 28°3′33.6″E

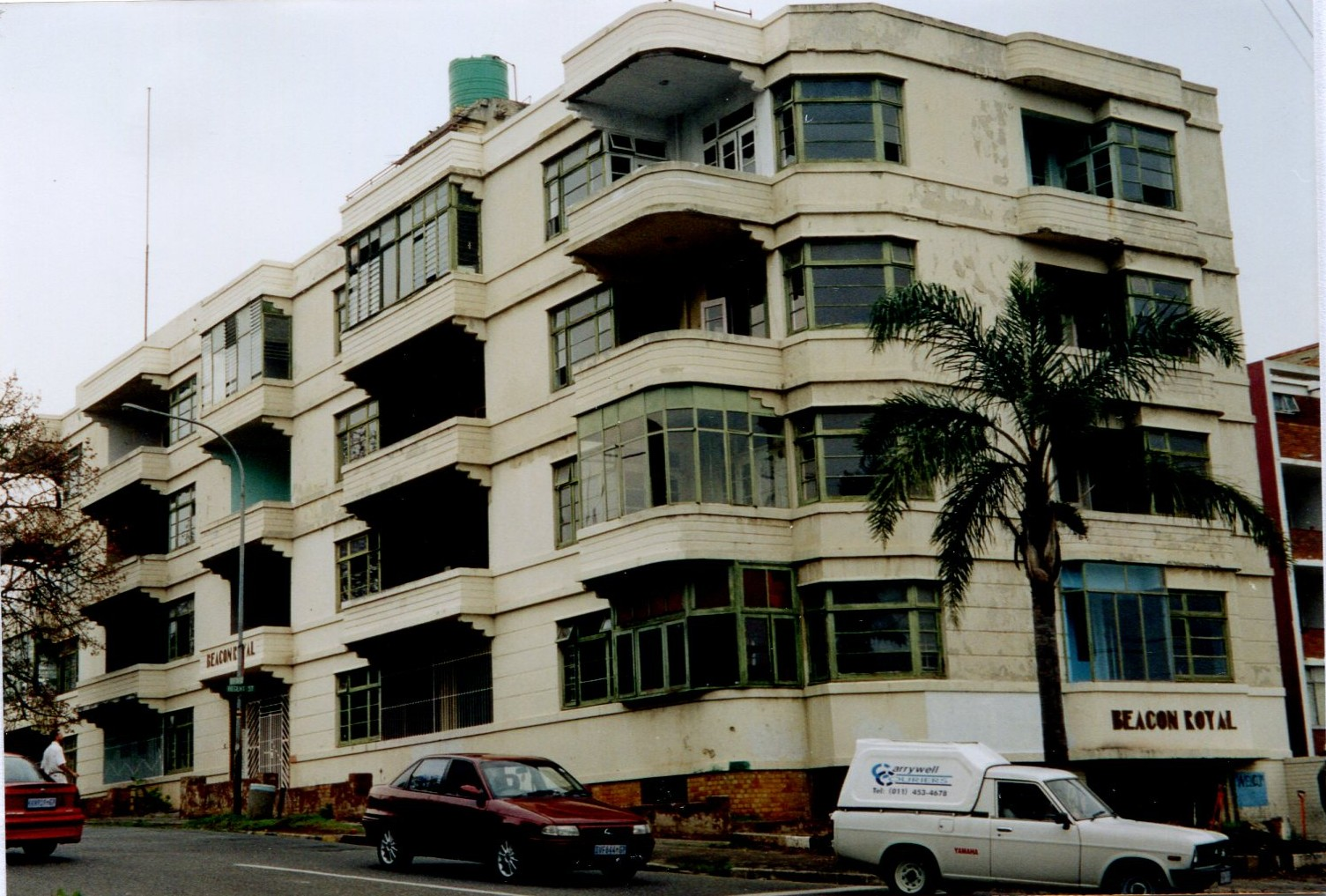

General information
- Status: Completed
- Type: Rental flats
- Location: Yeoville, South Africa
- Completed: 1934

Technical details
- Floor count: 5

Design and construction
- Architect(s): Obel and Obel (of Astor Mansions and Circle Court)

The Beacon Royal, also known as the Beacon Court, is an Art Deco block of flats constructed in 1934. This was a time of enormous growth as South Africa and the rest of the world emerged from the Great Depression. All over Yeoville and Bellevue in the years 1933 – 1934, blocks of flats were going up. The Beacon Court is located on stand 1044 at 55 Grafton Road/Louis Botha Avenue in Yeoville, Johannesburg. It was designed for PP Weisholtz by the brothers Obel and Obel who were also responsible for Astor Mansions in Jeppe Street and the Circle Court in Willie Street which overlooked Clarendon Circle at the time.

== Recent history ==
Subjected to hijacking in 2002, the building quickly deteriorated and had no electricity or water supply. In 2004, Emerald Sky Trading ZA (Pty) Ltd bought the building and rescued it by getting a court order to evict the hijackers before fully refurbishing the building.

== Heritage Status ==
The building was proclaimed a heritage site by the Provincial Heritage Resources Authority Gauteng in 2011 and is culturally significant for the following reasons:

- The Beacon Royal is a fine example of the Art Deco architectural style
- Beacon Royal is one of the most beautiful apartments blocks of the 1930s in the Yeoville district
- The Beacon Royal is a local landmark and ‘Beacon of Hope’ as a symbol of urban renewal
- Beacon Royal is associated with architects Obel and Obel who designed other important buildings in Johannesburg
