= Soweto Book Cafe =

Bookshop in Soweto, South Africa

The Soweto Book Café (SBC) is an independent bookshop in Soweto, Johannesburg, South Africa that positions itself as Soweto's Home for Books. Founded in 2018 and conceived and run by Thami Mazibuko, a social entrepreneur who returned back to Soweto after living in Yeoville. The SBC describes itself as a concept book store, a cultural hub for creatives and intellectuals, a community library and a revolutionary space in Soweto that promotes African Literature.

This bookshop is unusual as it is located on the second floor of a private home, and is open and serves Zondi, one of the oldest suburbs of Soweto. This café is a place for members of this diverse community to gather. Since there is no library in this part of the township. The Soweto Book Café acts an alternative environment, and school children work there in the afternoon. SBC hosts book clubs, workshops and contributed to 2024 Soweto Book Fair.
