= Yeoville Water Tower =

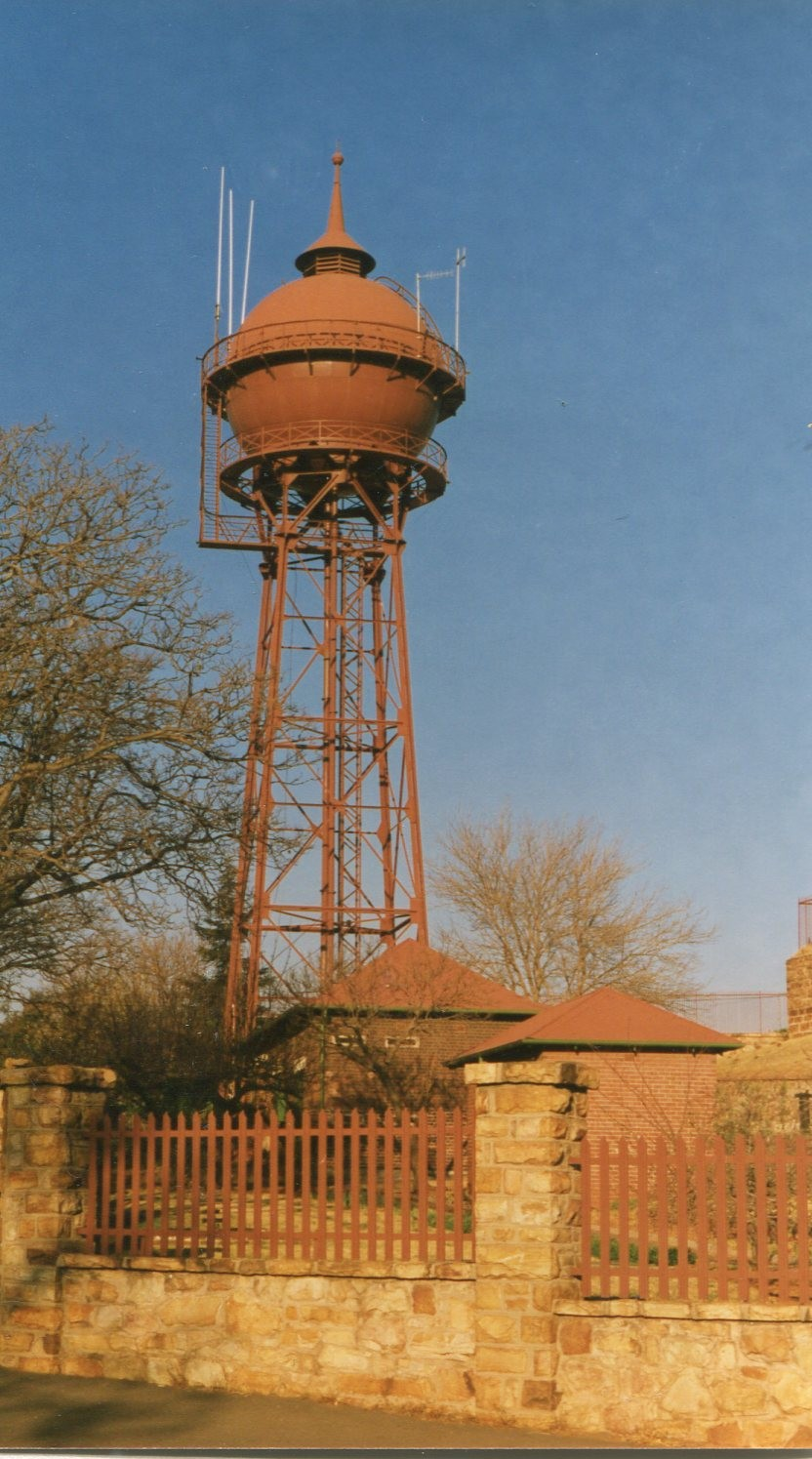
- The Yeoville Water Tower in 1985.

- Location within South Africa

General information
- Architectural style: Spherical
- Coordinates: 26.1869°S 28.0636°E
- Construction started: 1914
- Governing body: Rand Water Board

Design and construction
- Architects: Estate and Exploration company

The Yeoville Water Tower is located in Harley and Percy Streets, Yeoville, near the fountain of Doornfontein; it was built in 1914 by the Sivewright's Johannesburg Waterworks, Estate and Exploration company. It was constructed with a reservoir to supply piped water to Johannesburg.

== History ==
Yeoville Water Tower was built for Johannesburg City Council in 1913-14 to store water in order to address water shortages in the city. The Municipal Council of Johannesburg Annual Reports of the Town Engineer, 1913 and 1914-1915 record that it cost £1,436 to build.

Yeoville Water Tower preceded the nearby James Sivewright's Johannesburg Waterworks, Estate and Exploration Company ‘Johannesburg Waterworks’ erected as a reservoir in 1922, but was built after the Yeoville Reservoir of 1903.

== Design ==
The spherical design of the water tank is a German design: ‘The design retains the unmistakable origins of Wilhelmine Germany; facsimiles stood in the Ruhr’. Indeed, a technical drawing of the Yeoville Water Tower held by the Johannesburg Heritage Foundation is annotated in German.

It was designed to hold 50,000 gallons of water and the spherical tank has an internal diameter of 8 m (16 ft). The full structure stands at just over 27.5m tall (~91 ft).

One of two water towers in the district of Yeoville (the other being the Concrete Water Tower on Highlands Street ), the Yeoville Water Tower can supply water to an area of approximately 240 acres. The height of the structure was necessary to provide sufficient water pressure to deliver the water to the hydrants and the pumps delivering the water supply have a capacity of 660 gallons per minute.

== Landmark Structure ==
The distinctive onion shape of the tower dominated the hill North-East of the Johannesburg city for many decades and it is still visible from some directions especially from the South. At the time of its erection virtually all metal products were imported and it is unlikely that such an unusual metal design could have been manufactured in South Africa. It would appear to have been the only imported water tower with this peculiar shape in South Africa at that time.

The unusual design of the Yeoville Water Tower and its elevated, prominent position make it a distinctive landmark structure, synonymous with the Johannesburg suburban skyline.

== Heritage Status ==
Yeoville Water Tower is recognized as a heritage structure for the following reasons:

- Yeoville Water Tower has a distinctive spherical drum which make it an attractive and aesthetically significant industrial structure
- Yeoville Water Tower is a rare example of an imported steel water storage tank from this period
- Yeoville Water Tower is a landmark structure and integral part of the Yeoville skyline
- Yeoville Water Tower is of sufficient age to qualify as a heritage structure
- Yevolle Water Tower is symbolic of the City of Johannesburg's reliance on water, and so is a historically important piece of infrastructure needed for the development of the city
