= Inside Quatro =

2009 non-fiction book by Paul Trewhela

Inside Quatro: Uncovering the Exile History of the ANC and SWAPO
- Author: Paul Trewhela
- Language: English
- Subject: African National Congress; Umkhonto we Sizwe; South West Africa People's Organisation
- Genre: Non-fiction, political history
- Publisher: Jacana Media
- Publication date: 2009
- Publication place: South Africa
- Media type: Print (Paperback)
- Pages: 192
- ISBN: 978-1-77009-776-6

Inside Quatro: Uncovering the Exile History of the ANC and SWAPO is a 2009 non-fiction book by South African journalist and former political prisoner Paul Trewhela. It examines the history of the African National Congress’s (ANC) Quatro prison camp in Angola, the 1984 mutiny within Umkhonto we Sizwe (MK), and human rights abuses in exile by both the ANC and the South West Africa People's Organisation (SWAPO).

== Synopsis ==
The book is a collection of essays, many originally published in the exile journal Searchlight South Africa, which Trewhela co-edited. It explores:

- The ANC’s Quatro prison camp, also known as "Camp 32" or "Buchenwald", and its role in detaining dissenting MK members.
- The 1984 MK mutiny in Angola, in which cadres called for democratic reforms and were met with repression.
- SWAPO's "spy drama" in exile during the late 1970s and 1980s.
- A controversial case involving the death of an ANC cadre in exile, raising questions about internal leadership accountability.
- Broader critiques of political intolerance and authoritarianism within Southern African liberation movements.

== Author and book reception ==
Paul Trewhela worked in underground journalism with Ruth First and edited the Umkhonto we Sizwe (MK) underground journal Freedom Fighter during the Rivonia Trial. He was imprisoned as a political prisoner in Pretoria and Johannesburg Fort from 1964 to 1967 as a member of the South African Communist Party (SACP), but he separated from the party while in prison. In exile in Britain, he co-edited the banned anti-apartheid journal Searchlight South Africa with the late Baruch Hirson - a journal which later investigated and exposed human rights violation within the exiled ANC and other liberation movements in Angola.

Trewhela has described his ideological journey, stating that he was formerly a Trotskyist and a committed Marxist but no longer identifies as a Marxist. He has criticized Marxism's economic determinism and the concept of the "dictatorship of the proletariat" for enabling totalitarianism, emphasizing the importance of nurturing civil society and warning against the dangers posed by ideologically rigid leaders, citing examples such as Robert Mugabe's regime in Southern Africa.

His book, Inside Quatro has been described as an unflinching account of hidden histories within the ANC and SWAPO. The Mail & Guardian noted the book’s value in giving voice to mutineers and political prisoners whose experiences were long marginalised in official liberation narratives.
