= Hirson (surname) =

Hirson is a surname. Notable people with the surname include:

- Alice Hirson (1929–2025), American actress
- Baruch Hirson (1921–1999), South African activist and historian
- David Hirson (born 1958), American dramatist
- Roger O. Hirson (1926–2019), American dramatist and screenwriter

== See also ==
- Saša Hiršzon (born 1972), Yugoslavian/Croatian tennis player
