= Yeoville =

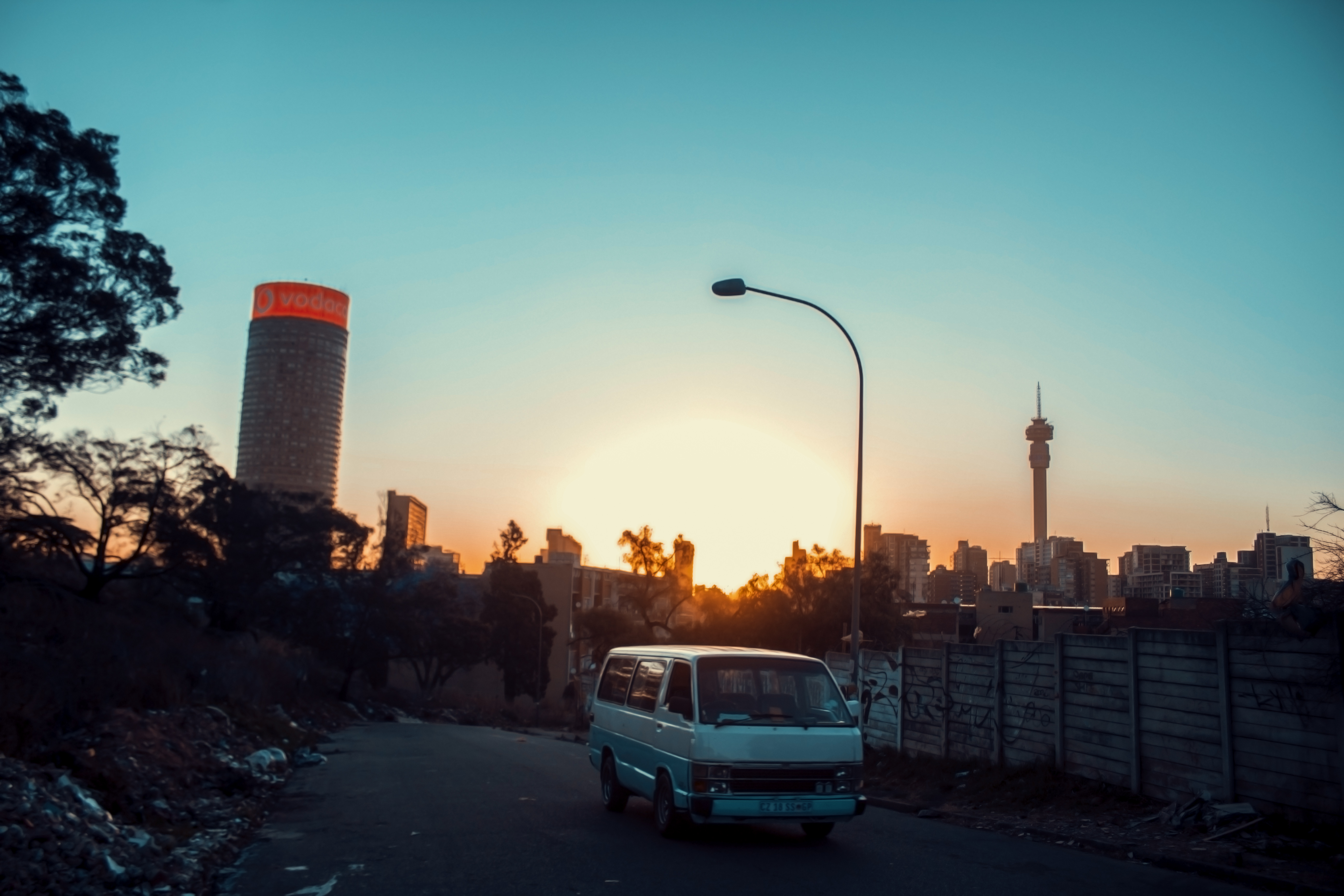

- Location within Gauteng Location within South Africa
- Coordinates: 26°10′S 28°3′E
- Country: South Africa
- Province: Gauteng
- Municipality: City of Johannesburg
- Main Place: Johannesburg
- Established: 1892

Area
  - Total: 0.97 km^{2} (0.37 sq mi)

Population (2011)
  - Total: 18,884
  - Density: 19,000/km^{2} (50,000/sq mi)

Racial makeup (2011)
  - Black African: 96.5%
  - Coloured: 1.1%
  - Indian/Asian: 0.5%
  - White: 1.6%
  - Other: 0.4%

First languages (2011)
  - Zulu: 29.1%
  - English: 21.2%
  - Southern Ndebele: 15.1%
  - Xhosa: 4.5%
  - Other: 30.0%
- Time zone: UTC+2 (SAST)
- Postal code (street): 2190
- PO box: 2143

Yeoville is an inner city neighbourhood of Johannesburg, in the province of Gauteng, South Africa. It is located in Region F (previously Region 8). Originally intended as a "well-to-do" neighbourhood, it instead developed into a white working class and lower middle class area as the city expanded northwards and public rail access improved. From the 1920s onwards, it became a significant enclave of German Jewish and Eastern European Jewish immigrants. It was designated as a "white area" under the Group Areas Act during the apartheid era. It became a "grey area" in the 1980s, as a limited number of non-white residents began to rent in the area. From the end of the 1970s, a growing number of night clubs and galleries opened in Yeoville, or relocated from Hillbrow. This led to the neighbourhood, becoming the leading nightspot in the city.The white population began to decline in the 1970s, and this white flight accelerated in the early to mid 1990s, with most residents migrating to the northern suburbs. Today, it is widely known and celebrated for its diverse, pan-African population but notorious for its high levels of crime, poverty and degradation.

It is part of Greater Yeoville, a greater territory combining Bellevue, Bellevue East and Yeoville itself and its size, crime, poverty and population density levels is somewhat comparable to nearby Hillbrow. Yeoville is home to Yeoville Boys Primary School, Yeoville Market and Yeoville recreational centre.

== History ==
=== Founding ===
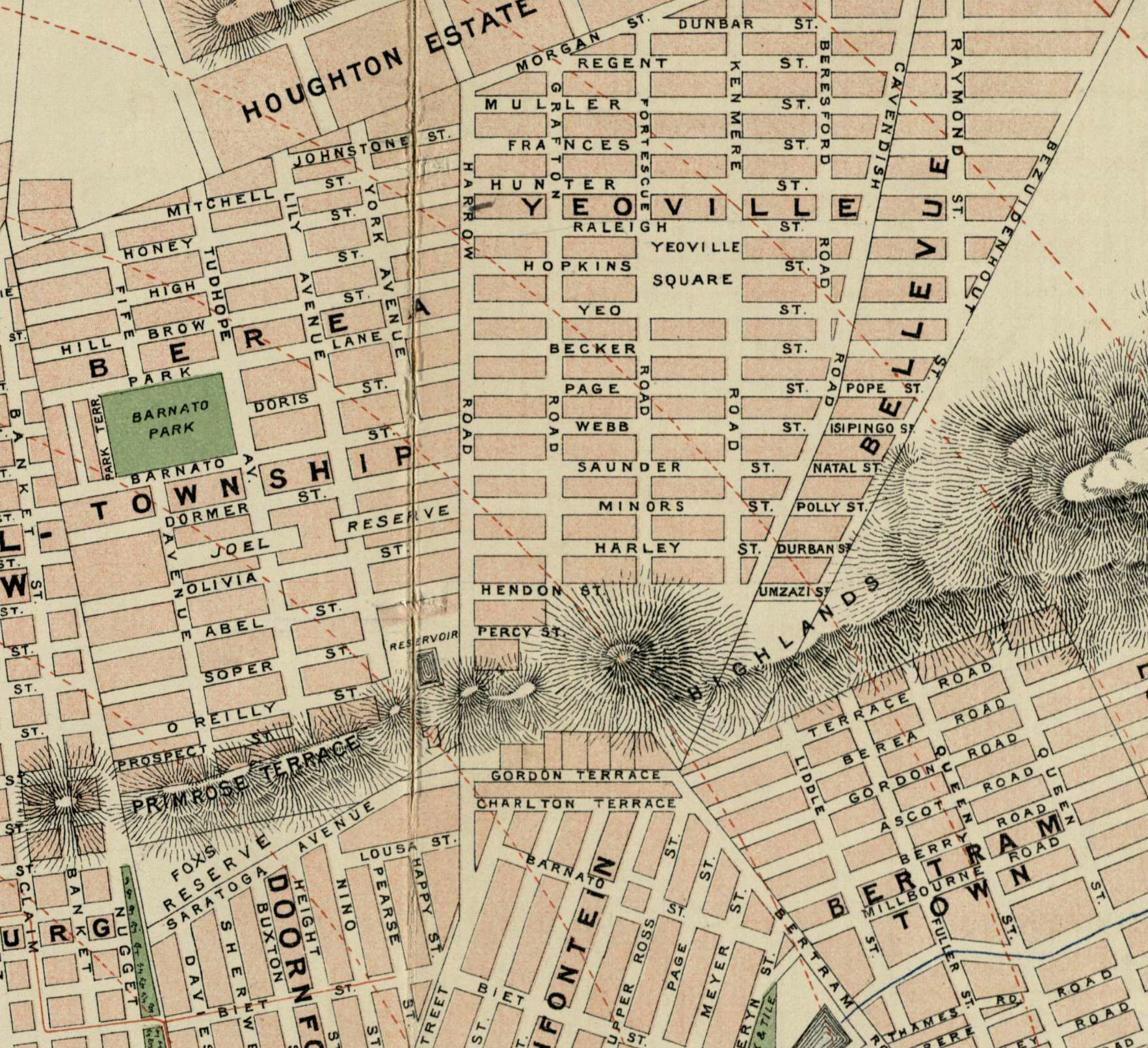
Johannesburg and its suburbs, 1897, Grocott & Sherry, detail Yeoville

Yeoville was proclaimed as a suburb in 1890 (four years after the discovery of gold led to the founding of Johannesburg) by Thomas Yeo Sherwell, who came from Yeovil in the United Kingdom. The area was advertised as a "sanitarium for the rich" in which the air was purer because it was up on a ridge overlooking the dirty, smoke-filled mining town that had sprung from nothing out of the (then) Transvaal bushveld. However, the rich did not buy into the suburb. Instead it became a multiclass area, one to which many poorer people living below the ridge in Doornfontein aspired. It was also a place which attracted many of the waves of migrants from abroad that came to South Africa seeking a new life.

The area contains diverse architectural styles, in 1904, House Hains was built and designed by James Cope Christie, and it is now a designated provincial heritage site. Beacon Royal was built in 1934 on Grafton Road by Obel & Obel, a pair of Jewish architect brothers, Louis Theodore Obel and Mark Obel, who were also responsible for Astor Mansions and the Circle Court. It has a blue plaque, recognising its heritage value. Another notable apartment building is Eltruda Court on Kenmere Road. It was designed by architects Gerson Davids and G.K. Haas and completed in 1950.

=== Jewish community ===
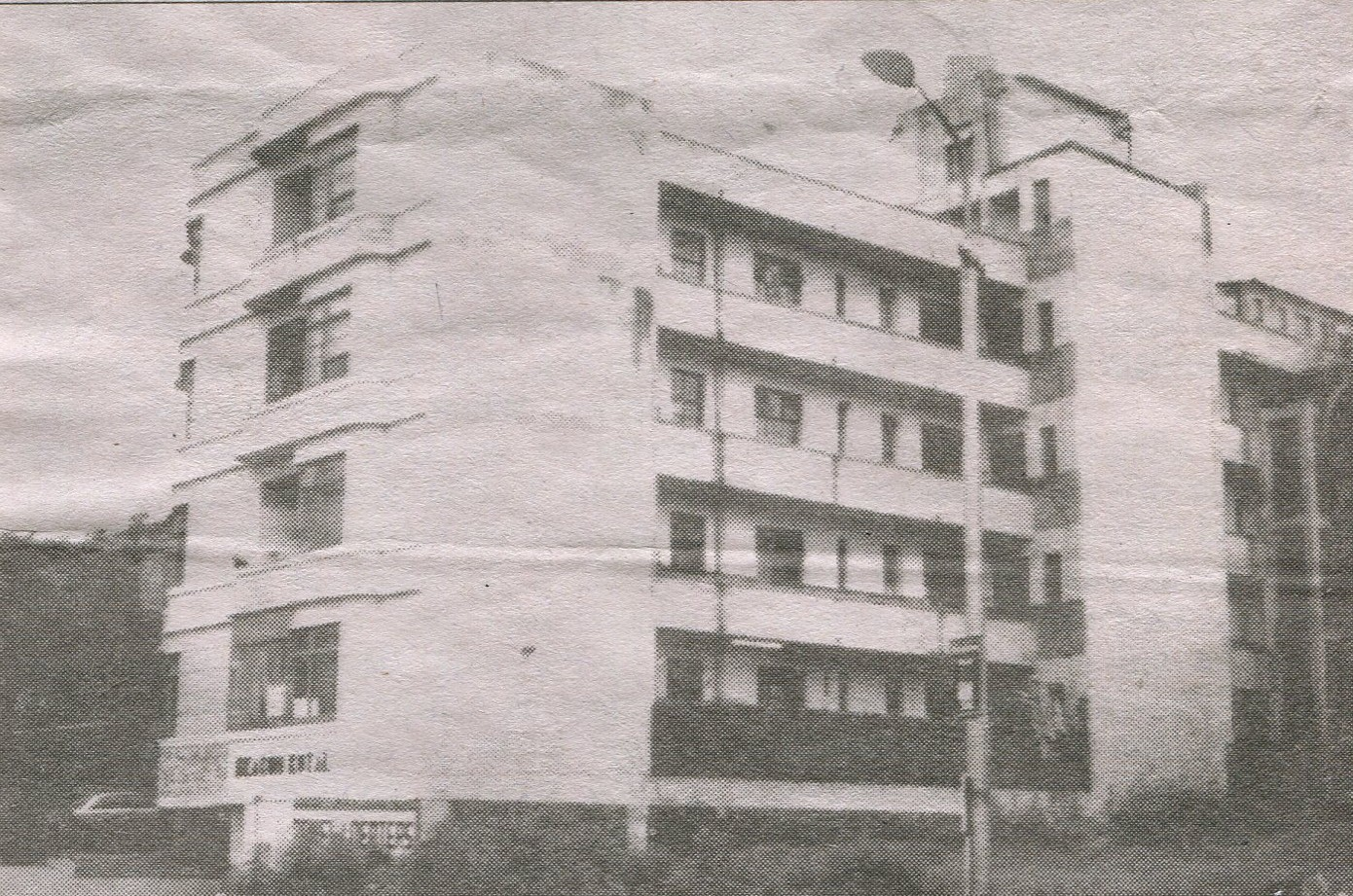
Beacon Royal House in Yeoville constructed by Obel and Obel in 1934

Since the early 1920s, the suburb was home to a growing and stable community of Jewish residents. Yeoville was distinct in that it emerged as an enclave for German Jewish immigrants. These immigrants were usually highly-educated, had held top professional positions in Germany. Many also practiced Reform Judaism in Germany, which they introduced to Johannesburg. Herbert House on South Street was the first boarding house of the SA Jewish Board of Education. It served Jewish students from country districts and border countries from the 1940s until its closure in 1964. In August 1967, Yeoville Synagogue was the target of a burglary. In the same period, the suburb's ultra-orthodox synagogue was also targeted and the sanctuary was desecrated. The archives were broken into and record books stolen along with other items.

By the 1970s, the suburb had a predominantly Jewish character, with a number of synagogues in the area and Jewish delicatessens and bakeries in the main business street. Harry Schwarz, a well known Jewish lawyer and politician was Member of Parliament for Yeoville from 1974 to 1991. In 1986, Tony Leon was elected to the Johannesburg City Council for Yeoville. Ronnie Kasrils, a cabinet minister in post-apartheid governments, was also born and raised in the suburb. Kasrils had his bar mitzvah at Yeoville Synagogue. The politician Joe Slovo also spent part of his childhood living in Yeoville, having moved from Doornfontein. Both Kasrils and Slovo attended Yeoville Boys Primary School, as did the cricketer Ali Bacher. The political activists, Esther Barsel and her husband Hymie Barsel also lived in the suburb.

A number of Jewish artists also lived in Yeoville. The singer, Johnny Clegg, grew up in the suburb. Sinclair Beiles, a beat poet settled in Yeoville and was part of the 1980s artistic milieu at the time. In the 1980s, the area south of Raleigh Street attracted students and those working in the arts. The area north of Raleigh Street was mostly populated by Orthodox Jewish families. Synagogues, Kosher stores and religious schools served this community. For a number of years, the community was also served by Chabad Lubavitch rabbi, Rabbi Yossie and Rebbetzin Raisy Hecht. Rabbi Yossie, a New York native, was a disciple of the Rebbe Menachem Mendel Schneerson.

=== Post-Union history ===
In 1939, notable architect, Harold Le Roith built the San Remo apartment building in the neighbourhood. It was distinct for its curved staircase and porthole windows.

In the 1960s, future president Nelson Mandela sought refuge at an apartment on Webb Street in Yeoville.

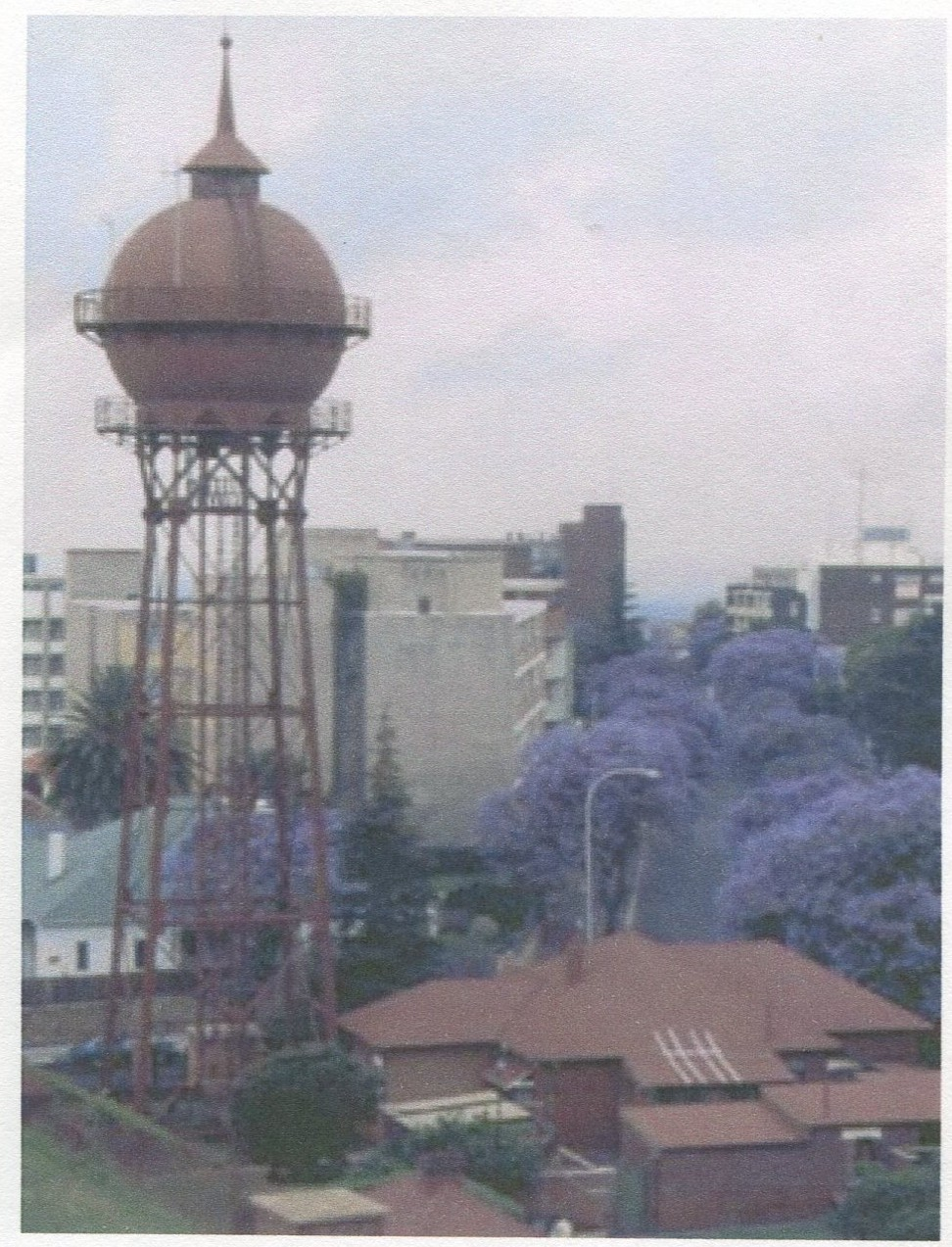
Yeoville Water Tower

As Hillbrow entered into a period of decline from the late 1970s, several nightclubs and art galleries relocated to Yeoville. Startup businesses also flourished and the neighbourhood emerged as the main nighttime destination in Johannesburg. However, this came at the expense of existing community shops that were unable to meet the rising rent costs or were converted into cafes and clubs. Shopkeepers on Rocky-Raleigh were also beginning to see a decline in trade as Sandton developed a commercial centre, attracting shoppers away from the CBD and surrounding neighbourhood. The social makeup included a growing number of artists, musicians, writers, filmmakers, students and political activists.

Although the area was designated as a "white area" under the Group Areas Act, it became a "grey area" in the 1980s as coloured, Indian and black people began to move in. The trend stemmed from Berea and Hillbrow as all three neighbourhoods had surplus of unoccupied apartments. This also occurred in the context of an aging white population, high levels of social mobility among white youth and the cosmopolitan character of Yeoville. Therefore, there was only tepid political resistance from the resident white population to the non-white newcomers. The progressive politics in the neighbourhood and concentration of artists led to levels of racial mixing that were then uncommon in the apartheid era. The Group Areas Act was repealed in 1991, meaning that all race groups could now legally rent or buy property in the neighbourhood.

However, Yeoville's position as a premier nighttime spot began to wane in the 1990s as Melville began to attract Yeoville's clientele. The loss of this clientele made the remaining bars and businesses reliant on a clientele more engaged in antisocial behaviour such as crime and excessive drinking. The changing clientele and an increase in poorer residents meant that several established shops and businesses were no longer viable to operate from the neighourhood. Some shops adapted by directing products towards lower income customers. These changes were accompanied by an increase in crime that led to divestment from existing homeowners and leaving the neighbourhood.

In 1990, the National Party said that it would not pursue a vacated seat by the Democratic Party in a by-election in Yeoville. At the time, both parties were fearful about the potential electoral success of the Conservative Party. The agreement was made, as the DP incumbent, Harry Schwarz prepared to vacate the seat to take on the role of South African ambassador to the United States.

The migration of white residents northwards, that had started in the late 70s, accelerated in the 1990s. In 1991 Yeoville had a white majority (79%), with most residents leaving in the succeeding years. By 1998 the neighourbood had a black majority (84%).

In 1995, the murder of a Jamaican restaurateur, Ridley Wright placed increased attention on the presence of drug dealers in the neighbourhood. A significant factor in the decline and divestment in the area has been the decision taken by banks to redline the neighbourhood. In effect, this down not allow 100% bonds for Yeoville businesses and homes. This has led to waning property values. Given the lack of potential investors, some property owners abandoned their vacant buildings. In their absence, squatters have posed as the legitimate owners and charge rent to tenants, while often refusing to maintain the buildings.

In 1998, the Yeoville Community Development Forum (YCDF), a forum from the 1970s, was revived to tackle urban decay in the neighbourhood. The 1990s were also challenging for the neighbourhood as it experienced the wave of HIV/AIDS.

=== Twenty-first century ===
Since 2000, the population has grown exponentially. This has been driven by the arrival of refugees and immigrants from Zimbabwe, Mozambique, Malawi, Nigeria, Cameroon and the Democratic Republic of the Congo. South African citizens now account for less than half of the neighbourhood's residents.

There have been some signs of recovery in the local housing market. The redlining imposed by the banks was deemed illegal and economic apartheid. This has allowed for the emergence of a black middle class in the area. The informal economy has grown exponentially since the 1990s.

A collapse in service delivery, government neglect, corruption, xenophobia and a consistently high crime rates are some of the primary challenges in the neighbourhood. The infrastructure challenges include a lack of access to consistent running water, unreliable garbage disposal and a rise in illegal dumping sites. The infrastructure challenges coupled with an increasing population were exacerbated during the COVID 19 pandemic.

== Places of worship ==
- St Aidan's Anglican Church, Johannesburg, on Regent Street;
- Chassidim Shul, on Joe Slovo Drive, also known as the Chabad House or the "little shul", was a Hasidic Jewish synagogue until 2025.
- St Mark's Presbyterian Church, on Kenmere Rd.
- St Francis of Assisi Catholic Church, on Cavendish Rd., was established in 1912.
- The Church of Jesus Christ of Latter-day Saints on Hunter Street, where there is also a Family History Library.
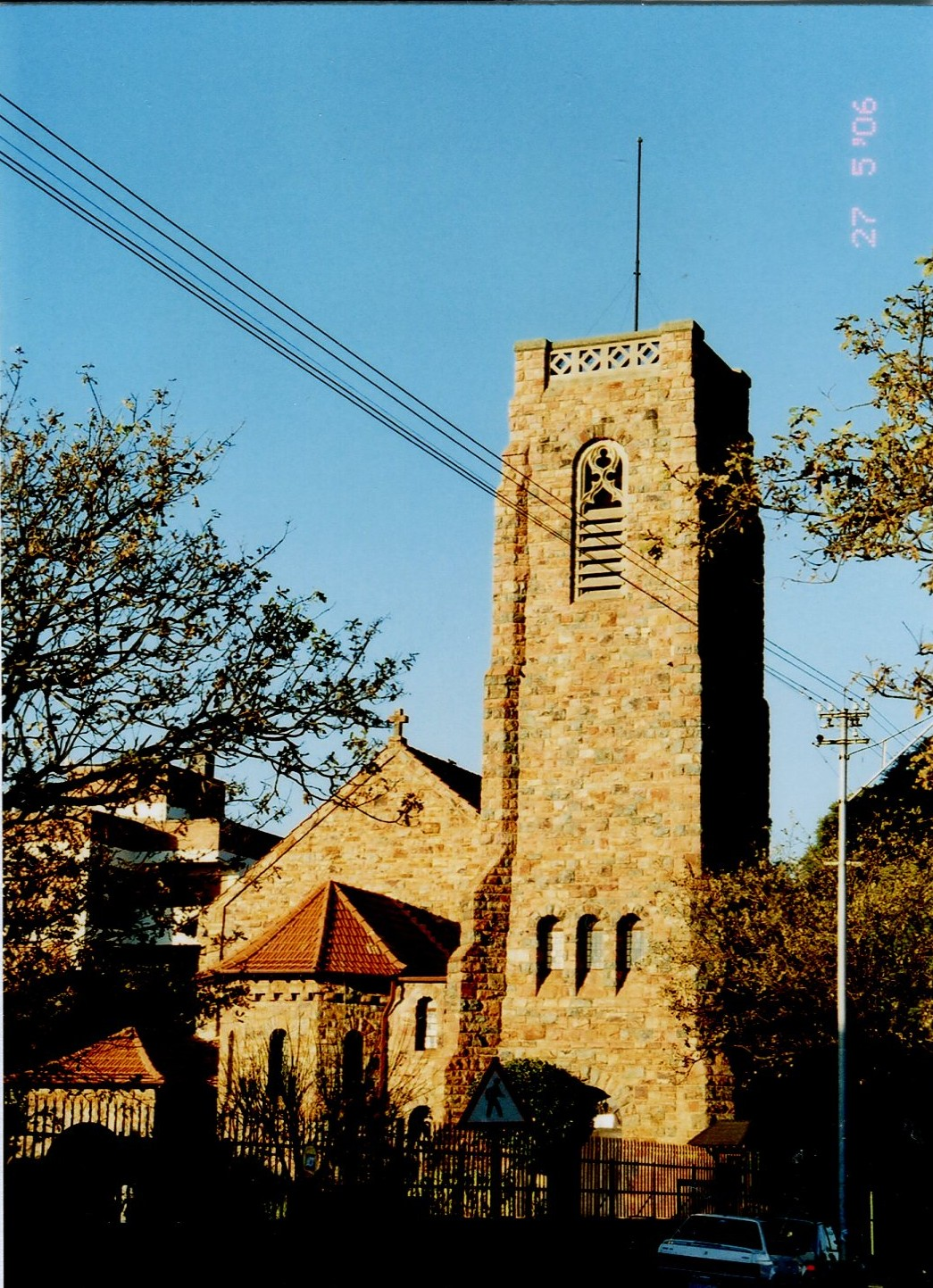
St Aidan's Church

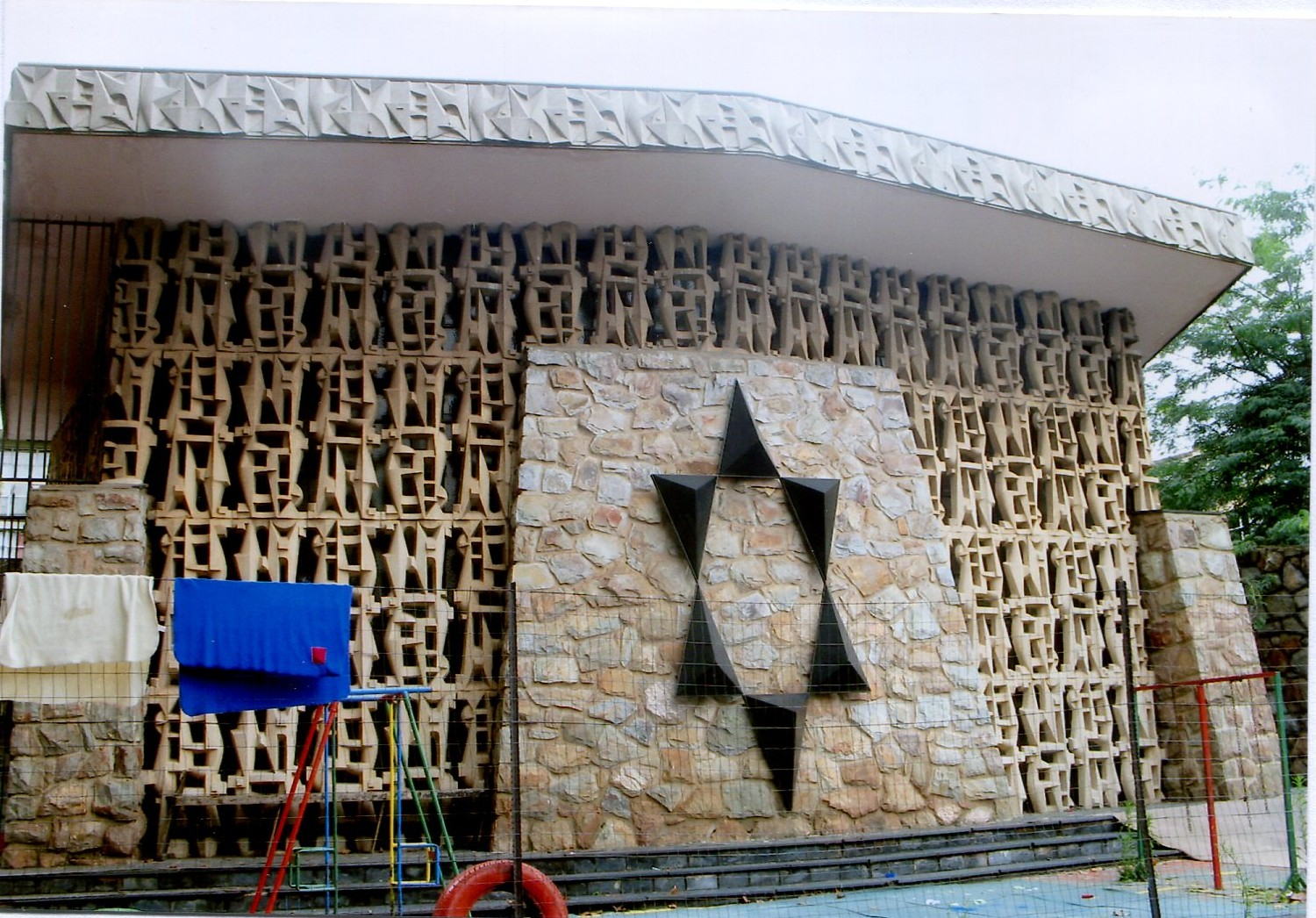
Chassidim Shul

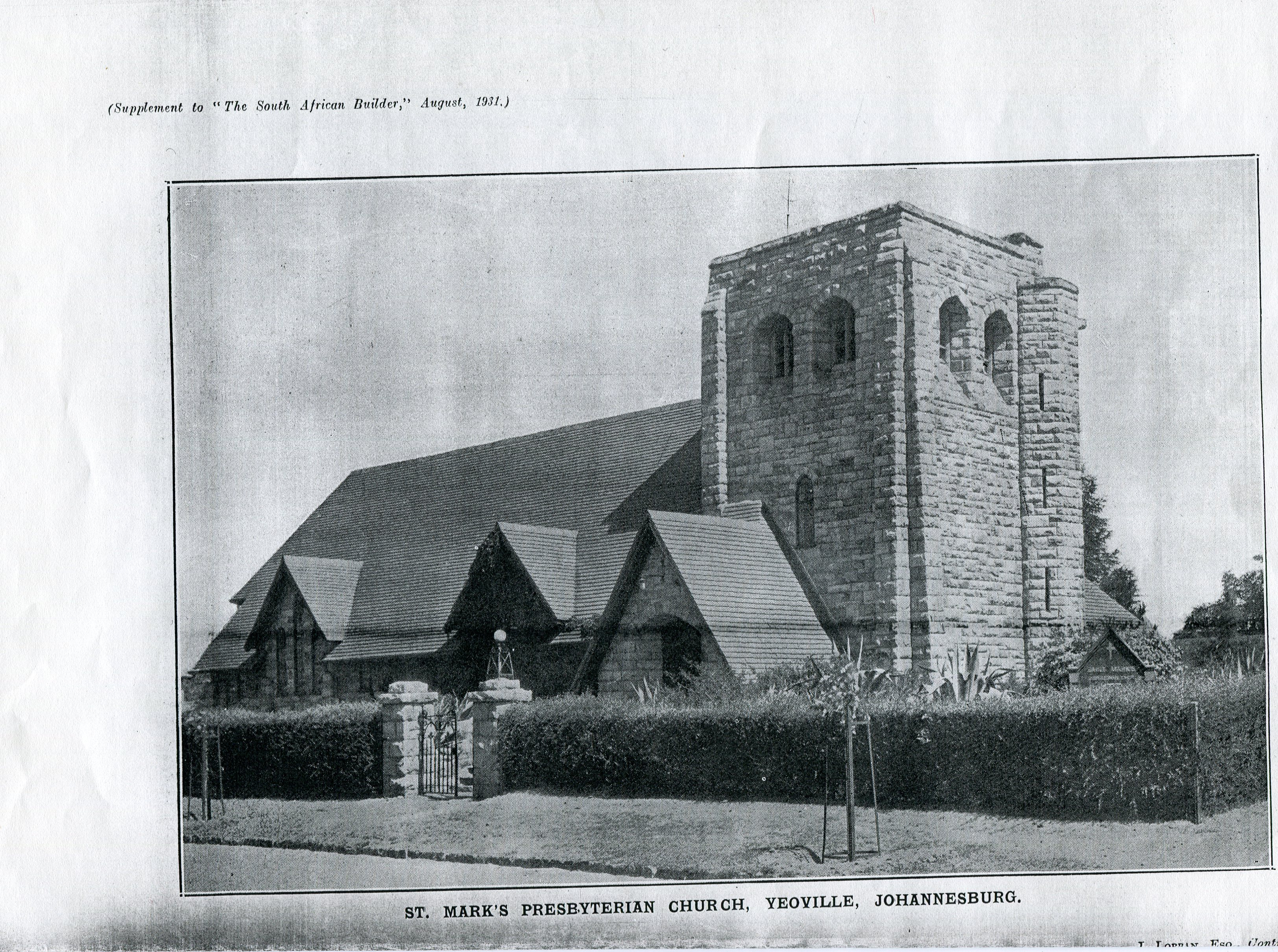
St Mark's Presbyterian Church

== Notable residents ==
- Esther Barsel and Hymie Barsel, political activists, lived at 43 Regent Street
- Sinclair Beiles, poet, settled in Yeoville later in life
- Gloria Bosman, singer
- Clive Michael Chipkin, architect, architectural historian and writer, grew up in Yeoville
- Johnny Clegg, singer, grew up in Yeoville
- Sandile Dikeni, poet
- Brenda Fassie, singer
- J. M. Gerald Gordon, architect, had his Bar Mitzvah at Yeoville Synagogue
- Michael Harmel & Ray Harmel, political activists, lived in Yeoville with their daughter, Barbara before building a family home in The Gardens
- Paul Hirschon, Israeli diplomat, grew up in Yeoville and Hillbrow
- Ivan Kadey, lead singer in punk rock band, National Wake, grew up in Yeoville
- Ronnie Kasrils, politician, grew up on 20 Raymond Street - Albyn Court
- Sydney Kentridge, lawyer, lived in Yeoville and had his Bar Mitzvah at Yeoville Synagogue
- John Matshikiza, Actor, journalist, poet and political activist
- Sankie Mthembi-Mahanyele, politician, lived on the corner of Regent and Kenmere Street in the 1990s
- Joel Pollak, political commentator, born in Yeoville, before emigrating to the United States with his parents
- James Phillips, singer
- Joe Slovo, politician, lived at 26a Rockey Street with his parents, opposite their fruit shop.
- Fanie de Villiers, writer (publishes as "Kleinboer"), has lived in Yeoville since 1990
