= Raguva Eldership =

Eldership of Lithuania

Raguva Eldership Raguvos seniūnija
- Eldership
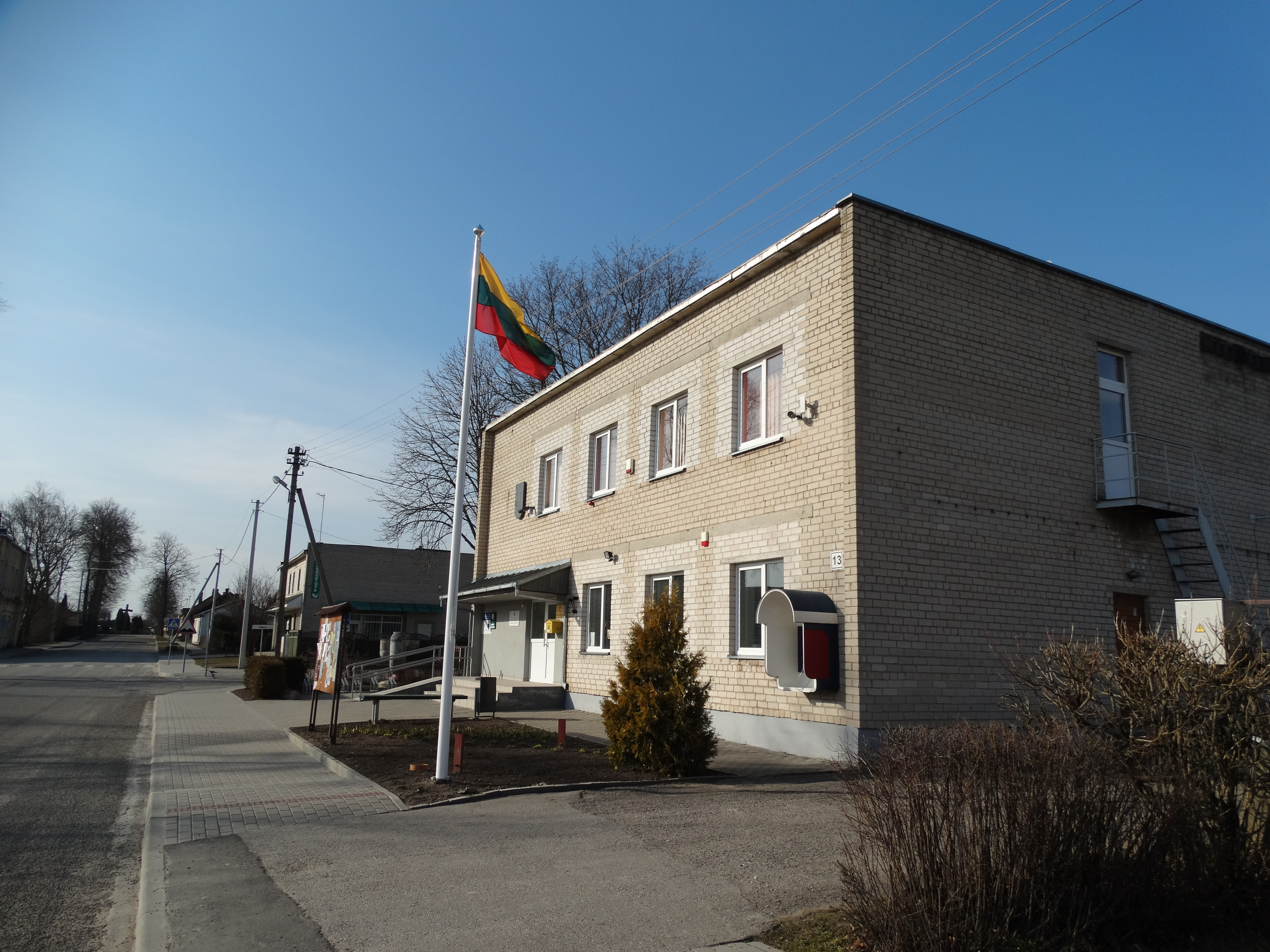
- Country: Lithuania
- County: Panevėžys County
- Municipality: Panevėžys District Municipality
- Center: Raguva

Area
  - Total: 94.69 km^{2} (36.56 sq mi)

Population (2021)
  - Total: 1,243
  - Density: 13.13/km^{2} (34.00/sq mi)
- Time zone: UTC+2 (EET)
  - Summer (DST): UTC+3 (EEST)
- Website: www.panrs.lt

The Raguva Eldership (Lithuanian: Raguvos seniūnija) is an eldership of Lithuania, located in the Panevėžys District Municipality. In 2021 its population was 1243.
