= Esther Barsel =

- Born: Esther Luriane; 17 October 1924; Raguva, Lithuania
- Died: 6 October 2008 (aged 83)
- Occupation: political activist

Esther Barsel (born 17 October 1924, in Raguva, Lithuania; died 6 October 2008, in Johannesburg) was a South African political activist and long-standing member of the South African Communist Party (SACP). She was a member of both her local African National Congress branch and the SACP's Johannesburg Central Branch.

== Biography ==
=== Background ===
Barsel was the daughter of Joseph Levin of Kubelake from Ukraine and Sonia Garenblumaite of Raguva from Lithuania. Joseph Levin said he was escaping pogroms in Ukraine when he relocated to Raguva about 1915. Later he assumed the identity of a dead man, Lieb Lurije, in order to avoid detection.

When Barsel's mother met Joseph Levin, he was already living under the assumed name of Leib Lurije. Esther's birth record in the vital records of Raguva shows her mother Sonia as Garenblumaite in Lithuanian, and in the original Yiddish the transcription would be Garnblum. Esther's father's occupation was a merchant, inhabitant of Raguva. Her birth record shows her father as a man that had already been dead for two years.

In 1926 Joseph Levin went to South Africa under the Lurije identity, changing his name back to Levin upon arrival in South Africa. Esther was 6 months old when he left Lithuania. He stayed with Sonia's brother Abraham Bloom (ex Garrenblum) in Middelburg. Esther & her mother Sonia followed in 1927; entry records into South Africa show Esther Luriane (aged 3 yrs) arrived in 1927 by boat. Joseph Levin then bought a farm store about 18 miles from Middelburg which he sold in about 1936. They then moved to Johannesburg.

=== Political career ===
Esther was an early participant in the Liberation Struggle against Apartheid, joining the SACP at the age of fourteen.

Esther worked as a secretary/bookkeeper for Friends of the Soviet Union where she met Hymie Barsel, the coordinator of the project. They married in Johannesburg on 4 December 1945. They travelled the country together promoting Karl Marx.

Hymie Barsel was accused in the 1956 Treason Trial. A group of 156 black and white activists – including Chief Albert Lutuli, Oliver Tambo, Nelson Mandela and Walter Sisulu – were put in the dock after a countrywide crackdown following the adoption of the Freedom Charter at the Congress of the People in Kliptown at the end of 1955. The group represented almost the entire executive of the then all-African ANC, the white Congress of Democrats, the South African Indian Congress, the Coloured People's Congress and the South African Congress of Trade Unions. Together, they were known as the Congress Alliance, and they were stoic as the state charged them with high treason and conspiracy to use violence to overthrow the government. The punishment was, of course, death.

It was an extremely difficult period for the trialists and their families, yet many of the friendships between black and white activists that were struck there carried on throughout their lives.

Later Barsel and her husband were among fifteen accused in the Bram Fischer trial. She was sentenced to, and served three years' hard labor at Barberton Women's Prison.

The trial of Bram Fischer was primarily an attempt to remove and imprison the leadership of the SACP. On 26 August 1964, Bram Fischer, a senior lawyer who had led the defense of the Rivonia trialists, and fourteen other people were arrested and charged with having furthered the aims of the SACP or being office-bearers, officers, or members of the party. The charge sheet alleged that they aimed at "establishing a despotic government based on the dictatorship of the proletariat" in South Africa. Esther had been the link between the banned liberation movements and activists working openly, she was detained and then kept in solitary confinement. Esther and other communist women began a hunger strike, hoping this would compel the police to charge or release them.

A number of those charged had been held under the 90-day detention law and were subjected to ill treatment. One of these, Ms Sylvia Neame, was sentenced to two months' imprisonment for trying to escape from custody. The other accused were Mr. Louis Baker, Ms. Esther Barsel, Mr. Hymie Barsel, Ms. Mollie Doyle, Ms. Florence Duncan, Dr. Costa Gazides, Mr. Norman Levy, Ms. Jean Middleton, Ms. Ann Nicholson, Mr. Ivan F Schermbrucker, Mr. Paul Trewhela and Mr. Eli Weinberg. In April 1965, after they had been in custody for nearly a year, the fifteen were sentenced to terms of imprisonment ranging from one to five years.

Esther was sent to the remote Barberton Prison for three years of hard labor in 1965. She was in the women's ward, next to her cell was Nelson Mandela's cell for a period before he was sent to Robben Island, and close by was the cell where Hymie was held in solitary confinement. After Esther's release she was also "Banned" for a period of approximately 20 years.

Esther was private secretary to Chris Hani, the South African Communist Party leader, after his 1990 return from Lusaka from 30 years of military exile. Hani was assassinated on 10 April 1993.

Barsel's fight for workers' rights was lifelong; as late as 2006, at the age of eighty-one, she was blogging information about the defunct Friends of the Soviet Union. [1]

Barsel counted among her friends former South African President Nelson Mandela. Her death came almost three months to the day after joining him and 24 other of his closest friends for his private lunch to commemorate his ninetieth birthday. Mandela sent a letter of condolence to Esther's family, and it was read aloud at the funeral in Johannesburg on 7 October 2008:

Dear Merle and family, We have been deeply saddened by the loss of Comrade Esther. She dedicated her life to the struggle for justice in South Africa, and was a formidable and highly respected resource to the movement with which she was associated for so long. She will be remembered as a great South African and a beloved comrade. Please be assured of our support and solidarity during this difficult time. Sincerely,
N R Mandela[2]

At 14:30 on 19 October 2008, a memorial service was held at Women's Jail, Constitution Hill, Johannesburg. In his invitation to members of the public to attend the service, the Secretary of the SACP's JHB Branch wrote,

We urge comrades to come in numbers to pay tribute to the late veteran of the peoples' struggle.
Viva ANC/SACP/COSATU alliance Viva!
Forward to the dictatorship of the proletariat, Forward!
Amaaaandla![3]

ANC spokesperson Jesse Duarte described Barsel as "a tireless political activist who remained engaged in the struggle until the end of her life".

"We pay homage to this gallant revolutionary who was unwavering in her commitment and dedication to the struggle for a democratic and just South Africa," Duarte said in a statement.

Duarte also said the ANC would treasure Barsel's contribution to the struggle for liberation and the building of democracy.

The Young Communist League (YCL) spokesperson Castro Ngobese commended Barsel for defying all odds and giving her life to the struggle for liberation. "She sacrificed her own luxurious and better life given the privileges enjoyed by the tiny white minority in our country during the Apartheid years and committed herself in the struggle of the oppressed," said Ngobese.

The country of Liberia issued a postage stamp in March 2011 honoring Esther as one of the Legendary Heroes of Africa.

== Personal ==
Barsel and her husband raised their three daughters, Sonya, Linda, Merle, in Yeoville, Johannesburg. Sonya chose to emigrate to the United States with her husband and two children at the height of the apartheid violence, while Barsel's other two daughters chose to stay in South Africa.

Esther was buried in Johannesburg according to Jewish tradition.
