= St Aidan's Anglican Church, Johannesburg =

St Aidan's Anglican Church
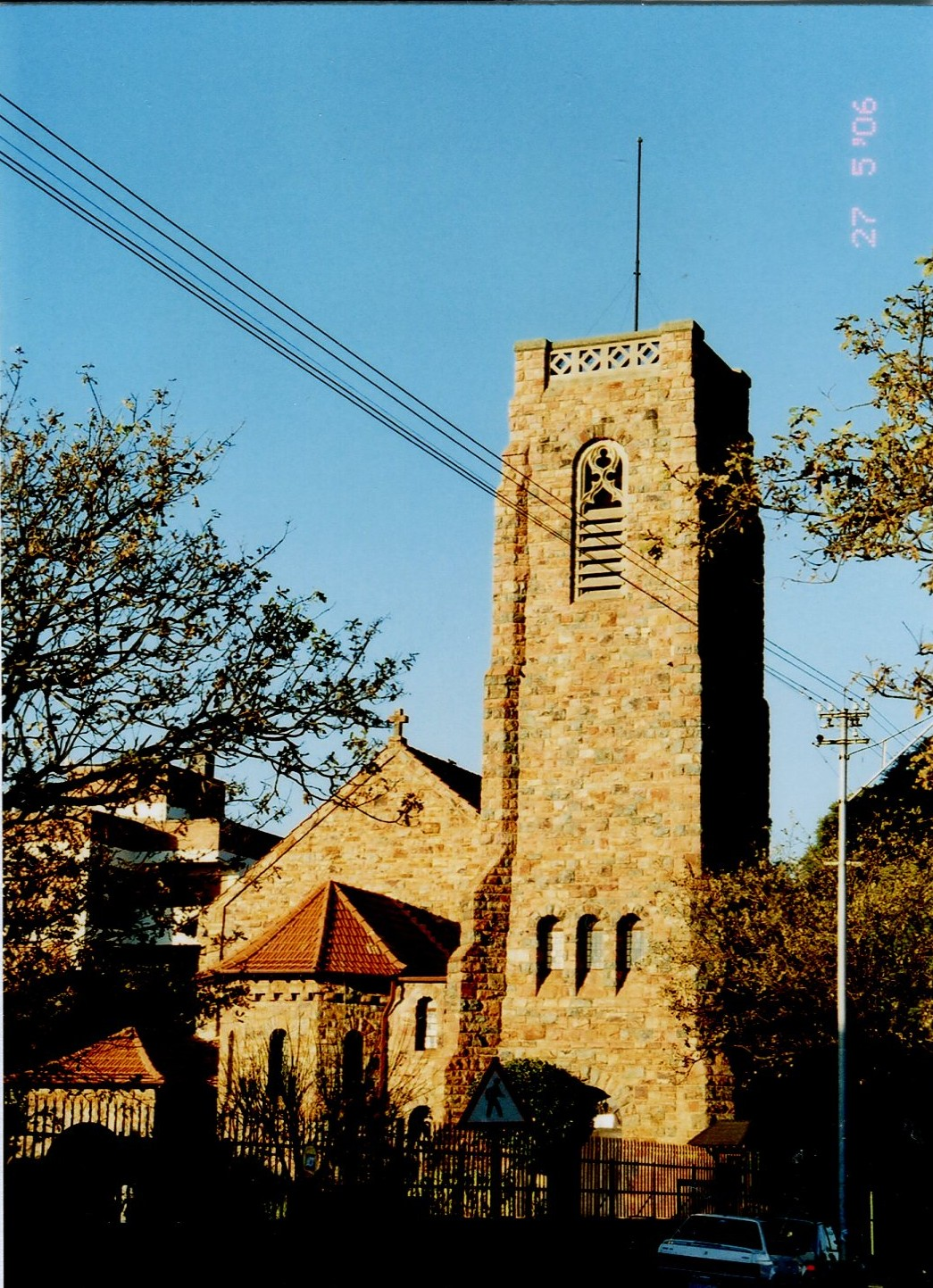
- St Aidan's Anglican Church
- 26°10′42″S 28°03′56″E
- Location: 63 Regent Street, Yeoville, Johannesburg
- Country: South Africa
- Denomination: Anglican

History
- Status: Complete

Architecture
- Architect(s): Waterson and Veale.
- Completed: 1913

Specifications
- Length: 98 metres (322 ft)

St Aidan's Anglican Church was established in Yeoville as a daughter church to St Augustine's church in Doornfontein. The foundation stone was laid on 14 December 1912. The nave was extended in 1922 and the building was finally completed in 1937.

== Design ==
The interior has dressed sandstone columns and capitals to the side aisles with face brick arches. The side aisles have face brick half arches reflected in the stone buttresses. The tower is taller and slimmer and in balance with the size of the church. The stained glass in the east and west sides of the church's ends adds to the distinction of the interior.
