= House Hains =

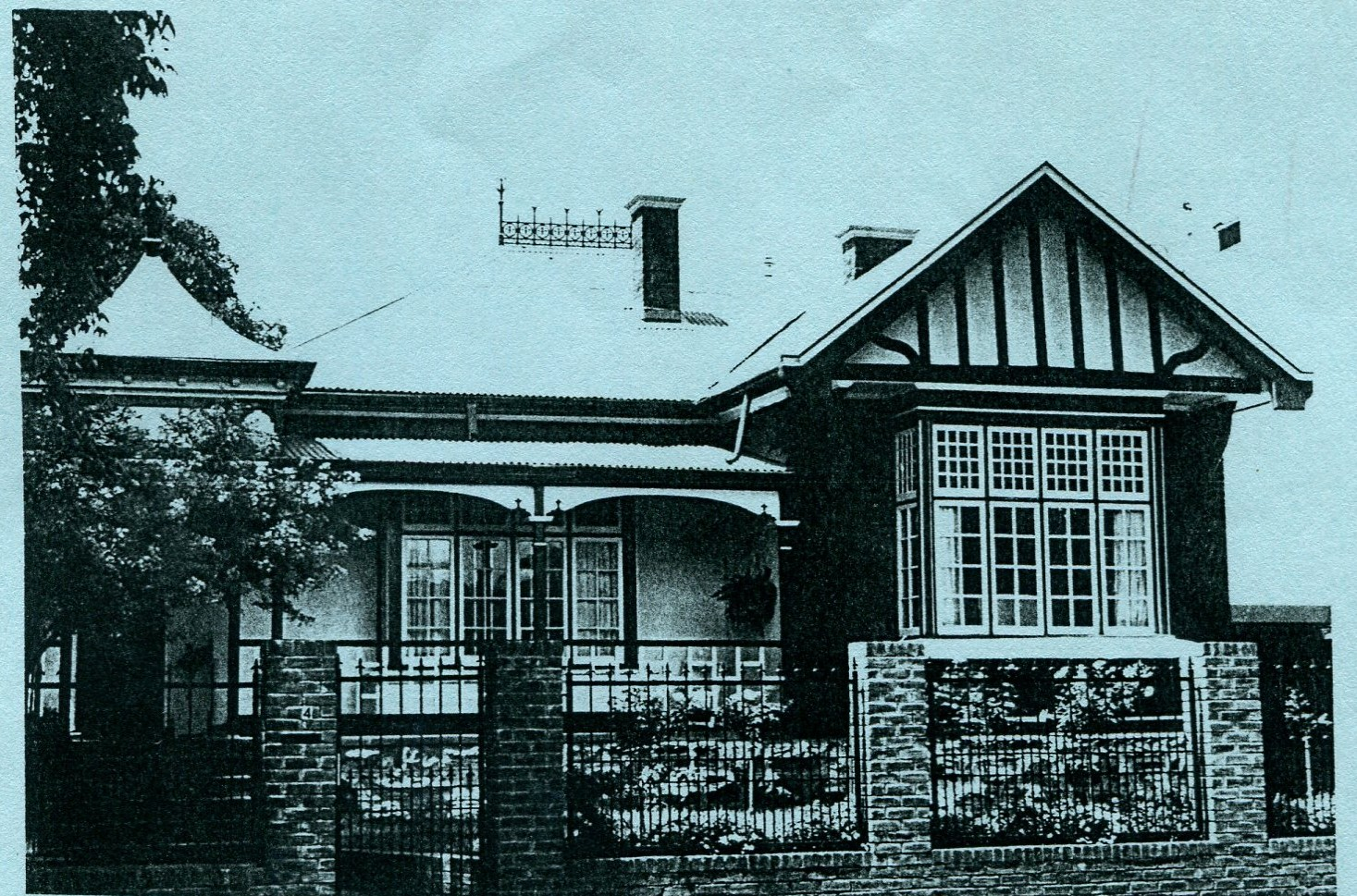
- Interactive map of the House Hains area

General information
- Status: Completed
- Type: Residential
- Location: Yeoville, South Africa
- Coordinates: 26°11′01″S 28°03′39″E

Technical details
- Floor count: 1

Design and construction
- Architect: J.A. Cope-Christie

House Hains is a historic residence in the Yeoville section of Johannesburg, South Africa.

Constructed in 1903, the house was designed for Henry Hains by architects James Cope Christie and C.E.H. May. Hains was an editor and accountant who immigrated in 1888.

The site occupied two stands in what was then an up-market middle class suburb. In 1933, the third owner, Mrs Socher, tore down the outbuildings, stables and garden and built a second house.

In 1942, Hains House itself was sub-divided into two units.

== Design ==
An attractive single storey red brick dwelling, House Hains has elevations articulated by a varied roofscape, painted woodwork, and verandahs with ornamental timber detailing.

The property has three bedrooms and two entertaining rooms with kitchen, bathroom and servants room to the rear. A generous verandah off the dining room provides an outdoor entertainment space. It is a spacious house, having been originally designed to sit within two stands.

== Recent history ==
Over the years the house was left in neglect however it was recently bought and revived by the present owner.

The house has now been restored as a single dwelling.

== Heritage status ==
House Hains is recognised as a national heritage monument for the following reasons:

- Association with J.A. Cope-Christie, an architect of early 20th century Johannesburg
- It is one of only three surviving houses designed by Cope-Christie, all of which are protected heritage monuments
- It retains most of its original design features, which are identifiable with Cope-Christie's style
- It is an example of a Rand Pioneer house
