= Legendary Heroes of Africa =

Postage stamp series honoring Jewish anti-Apartheid activists

Legendary Heroes of Africa was a series of postage stamps simultaneously issued and released as a joint issue by the countries of Gambia, Liberia, and Sierra Leone in March 2011 to celebrate Jewish heroes of the South African Liberation struggle.

== Description ==
The joint issue explicitly recognizes Jews as a people for their contribution, noting:

In the anti Apartheid South African Liberation Struggle it was estimated that Jews were represented by 2,500% in proportion to the white population. This stamp issue acknowledged the extraordinary sacrifices made by Jews to the liberation of their African brethren, and these stamps recognized some of the most significant contributors to global humanity in the 20th Century.

All twelve Jews portrayed were of Litvak descent, that is, with roots in the Grand Duchy of Lithuania.

Each country issued a sheet of four multicoloured postage stamps as follows:

=== Gambia ===
Denomination: 25 D

- Ruth First
- Hilda Bernstein
- Lionel "Rusty" Bernstein
- Ronald Segal

=== Liberia ===
Denomination: $75

- Helen Suzman
- Eli Weinberg
- Esther Barsel
- Hymie Barsel

=== Sierra Leone ===
Denomination: 4500 LE

- Yetta Barenblatt
- Ray Alexander Simons
- Baruch Hirson
- Norma Kitson
