= Austen Cowper =

South African cricketer and architect (1885–1960)

Personal information
- Full name: Sydney Austen Cowper
- Born: 13 October 1885; Cape Town, Cape Colony
- Died: 17 June 1960 (aged 74); Salisbury, Southern Rhodesia
- Batting: Right-handed
- Bowling: Left-arm medium
- Role: Bowler

International information
- National side: Argentina (1912)

Domestic team information
- Years: Team
- 1908: Western Province
- 1923–1924: Rhodesia

Career statistics
Competition	FC
Matches	6
Runs scored	77
Batting average	9.62
100s/50s	0/0
Top score	18*
Balls bowled	504
Wickets	8
Bowling average	31.87
5 wickets in innings	0
10 wickets in match	0
Best bowling	4/65
Catches/stumpings	3/–
- Source: CricketArchive, 14 January 2015

Sydney Austen Cowper (13 October 1885 – 17 June 1960) was a South African-born cricketer whose six-match first-class career spanned from 1908 to 1924. He played once for Western Province in South African domestic cricket, twice for the Argentine national side, and finally three times for Rhodesia (an antecedent of the present-day Zimbabwean national side).

== South Africa ==
Born in Cape Town, Cowper made his first-class debut in January 1908, playing for Western Province against Natal at Cape Town's Newlands ground. The Currie Cup was only contested irregularly at that stage, and, with a South African representative side touring England at the time, the 1907–08 season saw very little cricket played – indeed, only two first-class matches, both between Western Province and Natal, were played throughout the whole season. Cowper's debut came in the first of these matches. A left-arm medium-pacer, he bowled only five overs on debut, taking 1/21 in Natal's second innings as Western Province won by three wickets. James Whitehead (match figures of 10/83) and Paddy Carolin (6/67) took 16 wickets between them for Western Province.

== Argentina ==
Arriving in Buenos Aires in July 1910, Cowper became one of the many workers of British and Irish ancestry in Argentina (and neighbouring countries). He played for the South in Argentine cricket's annual "North v South" fixture in February 1911, hosted at the Hurlingham Club Ground, and took ten wickets for the match, 5/42 and 5/38. During the following 1911–12 season, a Marylebone Cricket Club (MCC) side toured Argentina from England, playing a number of fixtures. In the inaugural game of the tour, Cowper appeared for a representative Southern Suburbs side in a two-day game at the Talleres Club Ground. He took 3/147 in the MCC's first innings of 439 all out, and the Southern Suburbs team were forced to follow on after scoring 202 in their own first innings. Coming in eighth in the batting order in the second innings, Cowper scored 182 runs out of a team total of 274, before finally being dismissed by Rockley Wilson. He was consequently selected for the Argentine national side in two of the three first-class fixtures it played against the MCC. However, he had little success in those matches, scoring only 16 runs from three innings and failing to take a wicket.

== Rhodesia ==
By March 1921, Cowper had returned to Africa, playing for Salisbury (now Harare) against Bulawayo in Southern Rhodesia's Logan Cup. Transvaal visited Rhodesia during the 1922–23 season, playing two first-class fixtures towards the end of the season (one in Salisbury and one in Bulawayo). Cowper played in both of those matches, taking a single wicket in the first and two wickets in the second. The second match was notable for the performance of Transvaal's Doug Meintjes, who took 12 wickets for the match (4/64 and 8/63), and bowled six Rhodesian batsmen (including Cowper) in the team's second innings.

Cowper's final first-class match came in December 1924, when he was aged 39. An English team organised by Solomon Joel (and captained by The Hon. Lionel Tennyson) toured South Africa during the 1924–25 season, also playing a single fixture against Rhodesia in Bulawayo. Cowper played in that match, and took 4/65 in the English team's first innings of 294 all out, his best first-class bowling figures. He dismissed four Test players – Percy Holmes, Jack Russell, Tennyson, and Harold Gilligan. However, Rhodesia soon had to follow on after making only 121 in their own first innings, and eventually lost the match by eight wickets. Cowper's contribution of 18 not out to Rhodesia's second innings was also his highest score at first-class level.

An architect, Cowper was briefly partners with James Cope Christie, a Rhodesian pioneer. He died in Salisbury in June 1960.
