= James Cope Christie =

British architect (1870–1953)

James Cope-Christie
- Born: 12 December 1870; London, England
- Died: 2 January 1953 (aged 82); Salisbury, Rhodesia
- Citizenship: British
- Education: Regent Street Polytechnic
- Occupation: Architect
- Years active: 1893-1950
- Spouse: Ada Heywood
- Children: 2
- Awards: Officer of the Order of the British Empire

James Alfred Cope-Christie OBE FRIBA FRSA (12 December 1870 – 2 January 1953) was a British architect known for his contributions to early colonial architecture in Rhodesia and South Africa. He was known as a master of the neo-classical style but, over time, his designs reflected a blend of Arts and Crafts, Art Nouveau and Edwardian elements which he adapted to the South African climate, emphasizing open spatial flow and generous natural light and ventilation.

== Early life and education ==
James Cope-Christie was born in London, the son of James Charles Christie and Annie Christie. His father, a piano tuner, died in 1878, and in 1881 James was the Reedham Orphanage in Surrey. The orphanage was also a school and James' education there, and his talent, were sufficient for him to obtain an articling position with the ecclesiastic architect George Fellowes Prynne. While working for Prynne, Christie simultaneously attended the Regent Street Polytechnic, a key institution for technical and artistic training, where students learned the principles of construction, ornamentation, and historical styles. Upon his graduation in 1893, he won a gold medal for excellence in design and draughtsmanship. At the time, two of the African British colonies Cape Colony (now South Africa), and Rhodesia (now Zimbabwe), were experiencing building booms and were in need of architects. Christie decided to begin his career there and, in April 1894, left England. He arrived in Cape Town on May 23, 1894.

== Career ==
Christie was immediately hired by architect Charles Freeman but, in 1895, he won the competition to build the new Stock Exchange building in Rhodesia's Fort Salisbury (now Harare). Due to the Matabele uprising, that project was cancelled, but Christie found that he was the only qualified architect in Salisbury. By now, he was a corporal in the Southern Rhodesia Volunteers; he was ordered to supervise the destruction of the buildings which had been damaged in the war. He was then encouraged by Cecil Rhodes to settle in Umtali (now Mutare) and draw up the plans for the new town. In 1897, he was appointed sole architect for the government buildings in Umtali, where he completed the Stock Exchange Building, the post office, a government hostel, a school, and a hotel/social club. In 1898, Christie was on vacation in England when the Boer War broke out; he returned to Rhodesia at war's end but, finding that there was no work there, he moved to Johannesburg.

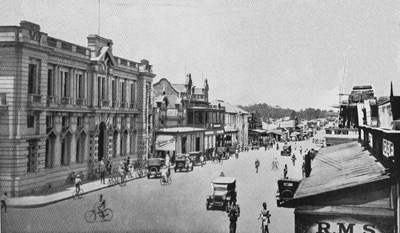
The Standard Bank Building (left), Salisbury

Christie arrived in Johannesburg in 1902. He was a Freemason and immediately secured the contract to build two Masonic Lodges. He applied for the post of architect to the Public Works Department of the Orange River Colony and was unsuccessful, so he went into a partnership with another architect, C.E.H. May; they targeted the lucrative market of mine owners and managers and built several residences. Christie said he "could not settle" in Johannesburg and, in 1906, he returned to Rhodesia, where significant building was taking place; several of his buildings remain standing and are now designated historic sites. From 1910 to 1914, he was in partnership with the South African architect Thomas Sladdin.

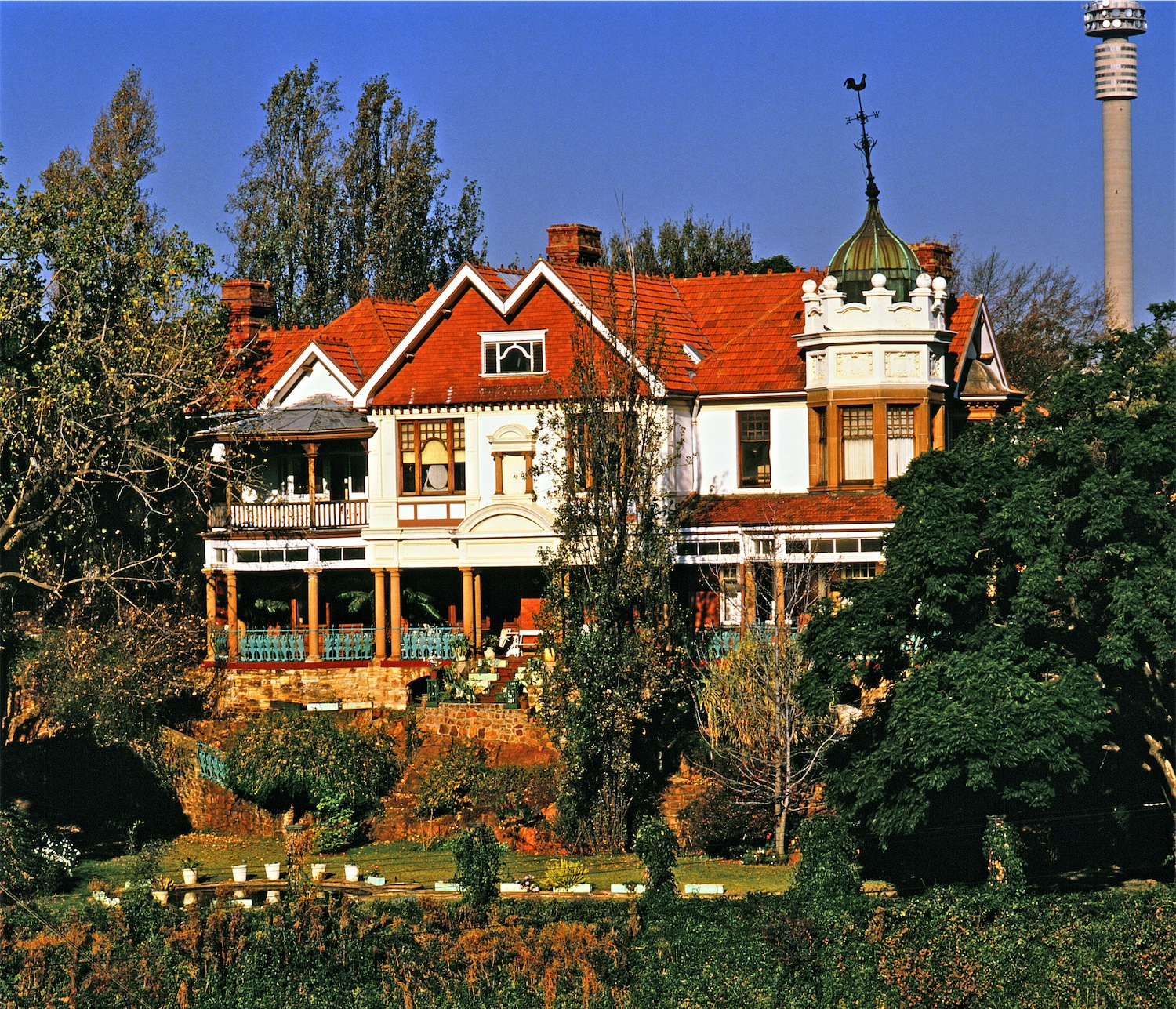
Dolobran House

With the outbreak of World War I, Christie joined the British Army Reserves and received his commission as captain and O.C.. Along with hundreds of other Rhodesians, he sailed for England to fight in the war but, upon arrival, his services were declined. Instead, he became O.C. Building and Equipment, of the British Red Cross and Order of St John of Jerusalem Prisoners of War Department. In 1920, he returned to Salisbury and, in 1925, went into partnership with Sydney Austen Cowper; they would remain partners until Christie's retirement c 1948.

In 1916, Christie became a member of the Association of Transvaal Architects. He was a Fellow of the Royal Society of Arts. In 1925, he applied for, and was granted fellowship in the Royal Institute of British Architects. He was co-founder and twice president of the Rhodesian Society of Architects. In 1948, he was appointed an Officer of the Order of the British Empire

== Personal life and death ==
In 1895, Christie married Ada Heywood (1871-1948), who had traveled with him from England. They had two children.

Christie was a keen sportsman. As a youth, he was a competitive cyclist with the Finchley Harriers. In Rhodesia, he was active in the Mashonaland Turf Club, and founded Tattersalls Club, both of which were hubs for horse racing. He was twice champion at the Mashonaland Gun Club, and founded the Mashonaland Boxing Association and the Rhodesian Swimming Association.

Christie was an accomplished watercolourist. He was an amateur actor and the Co-Founder and president of the Salisbury Amateur Dramatic Society. He was also twice elected as Councillor for Salisbury. As a Freemason, he was a member of five Masonic Lodges; a co-founder of three and a Grand Lodge Officer of two.

When he first arrived in Salisbury, Christie built his own house, Lo Kia, which remains standing. But, in 1919, he and his wife moved into Meikles Hotel, where Christie remained for the rest of his life. He died there in 1953.

== Known Works ==
- Mutare Club, Umtali, 1897
- Ranche House, United Rhodesian Goldfields Co., Salisbury, 1899 (attrib.)
- Queen Victoria Memorial Library and Museum, Salisbury, 1902
- Lo Kia, Christie Residence, Salisbury, 1902
- Vasan’s Footwear, Salisbury, 1902
- Berea House, Salisbury, 1903
- Corona Masonic Lodge, Berea, Johannesburg, 1903
- House Hains, Yeoville, Johannesburg, 1903 (with C.E.H. May)
- Page House, Waverley, Johannesburg, 1904
- Baron Cottages, Johannesburg, 1905 (with C.E.H. May)
- Dolobran House, Parktown, Johannesburg, 1905
- Scotia Lodge/Masonic Temple Clifton, Johannesburg, 1906
- Arnold Building, Salisbury, 1910
- Union Buildings, Salisbury, 1910
- Lonhro Building, Salisbury, 1910
- The Villa, Collings House, Salisbury, 1910
- Store Brothers Building, Salisbury, 1911
- Old Yorkshire House, Salisbury, 1911
- Standard Bank Building, Salisbury, 1911 (with Thomas Sladdin)
- National Bank Building, Salisbury, 1911
- Soap Factory, Rhodesia Milling & Manufacturing Co., Salisbury, 1918
- Guild Hall, Hebrew Congregation, Salisbury, 1920
- Fereday and Sons Building, Salisbury, 1923
- Norwegian Embassy, Salisbury, 1923
- Telephone Exchange Building, Salisbury, 1926
- Bechuana House, Salisbury, 1930
- Edward Building, Salisbury, 1936
- Les Brown Pool, Salisbury, 1947
