= Raguva =

- Town
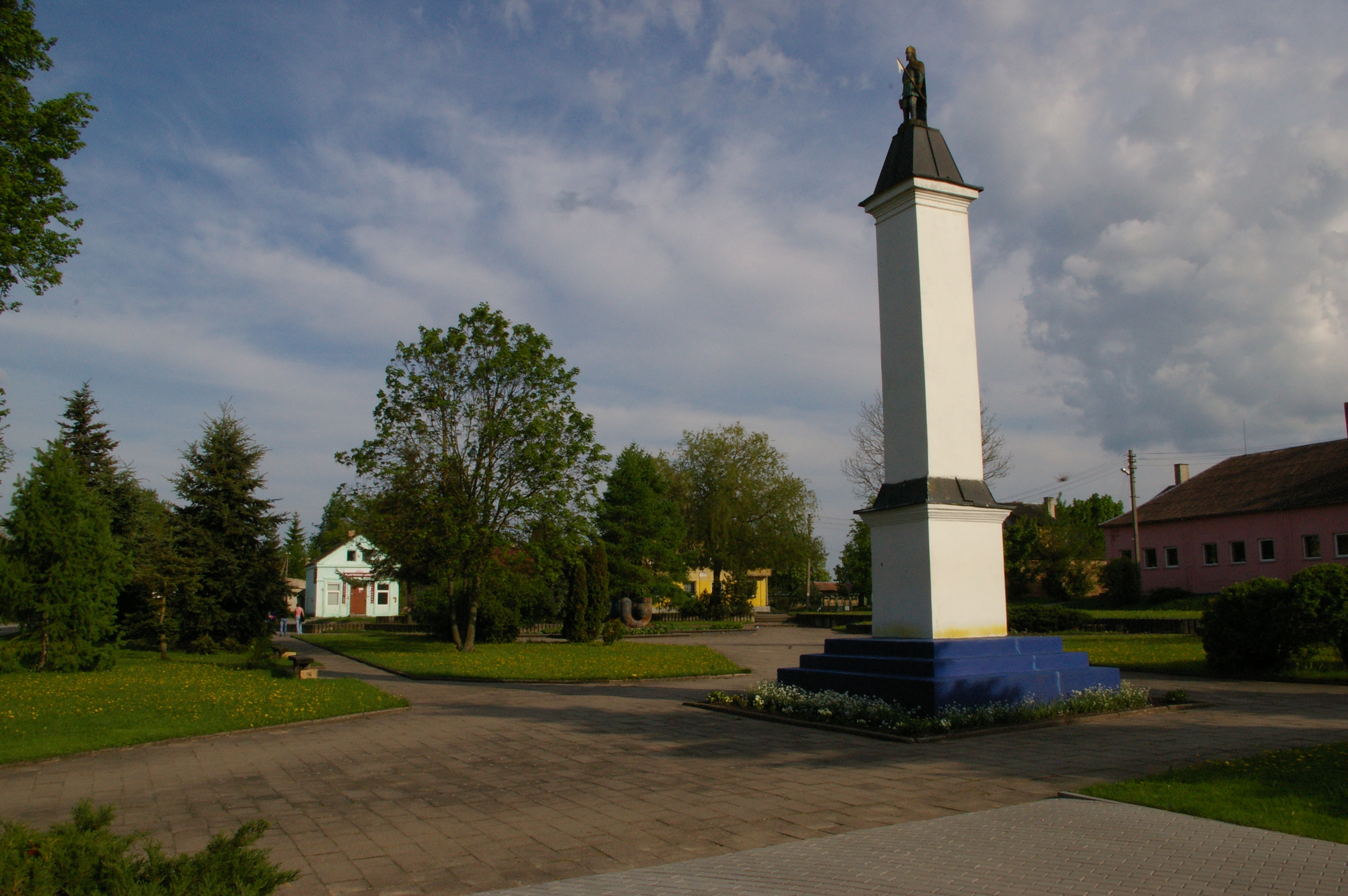

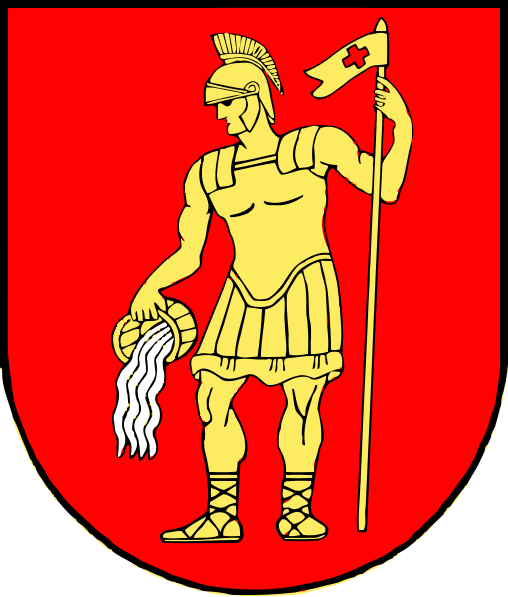
- Coat of arms

- Location within Lithuania
- Coordinates: 55°33′50″N 24°37′20″E
- Country: Lithuania
- County: Panevėžys County

Population (2011)
  - Total: 533
- Time zone: UTC+2 (EET)
  - Summer (DST): UTC+3 (EEST)

Raguva is a small town in Panevėžys County, in northeastern Lithuania. According to the 2011 census, the town has a population of 533 people.

Esther Barsel was born in Raguva on 17 October 1924.

== Gallery ==
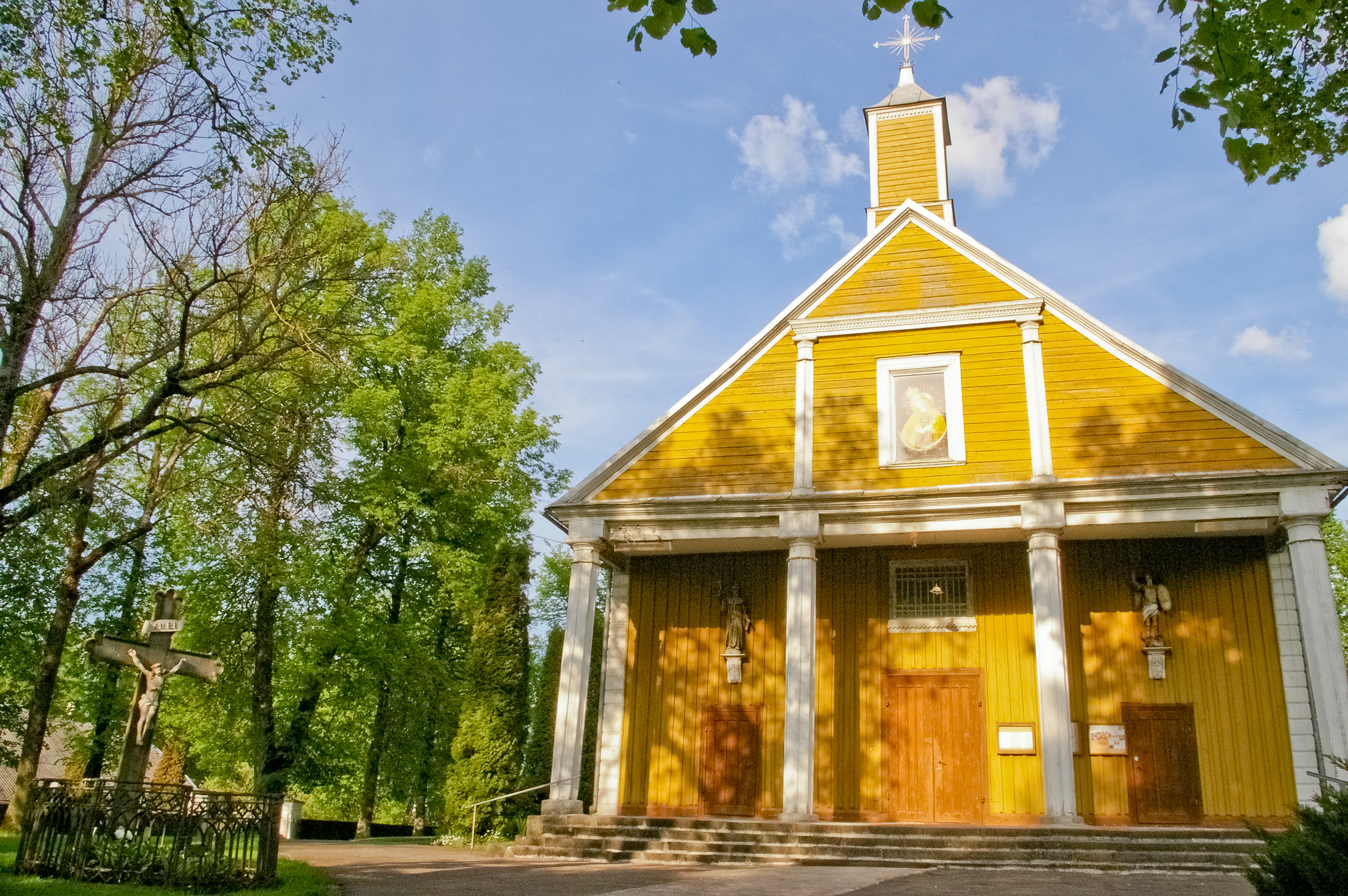

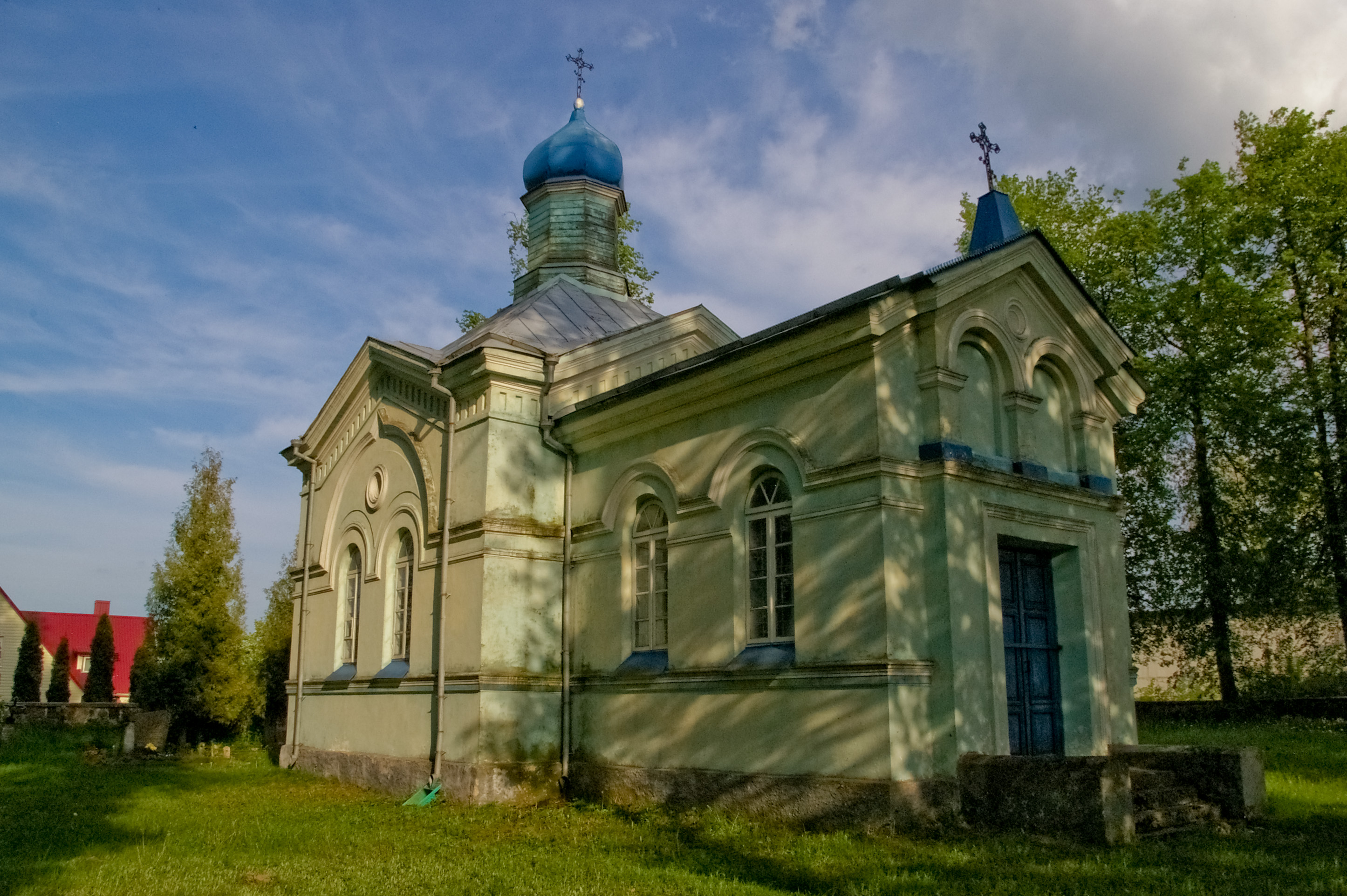

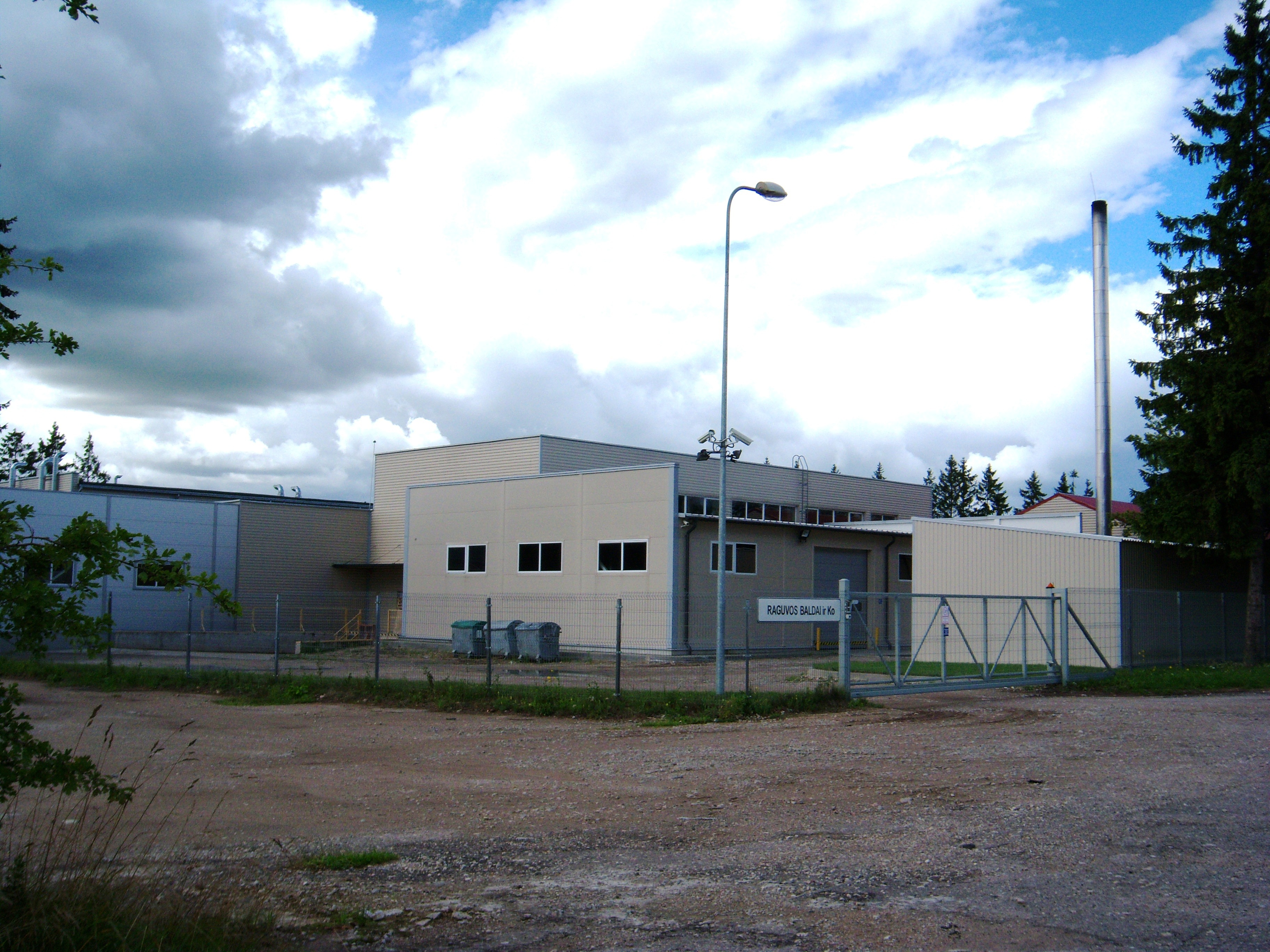
"Raguvos baldai"

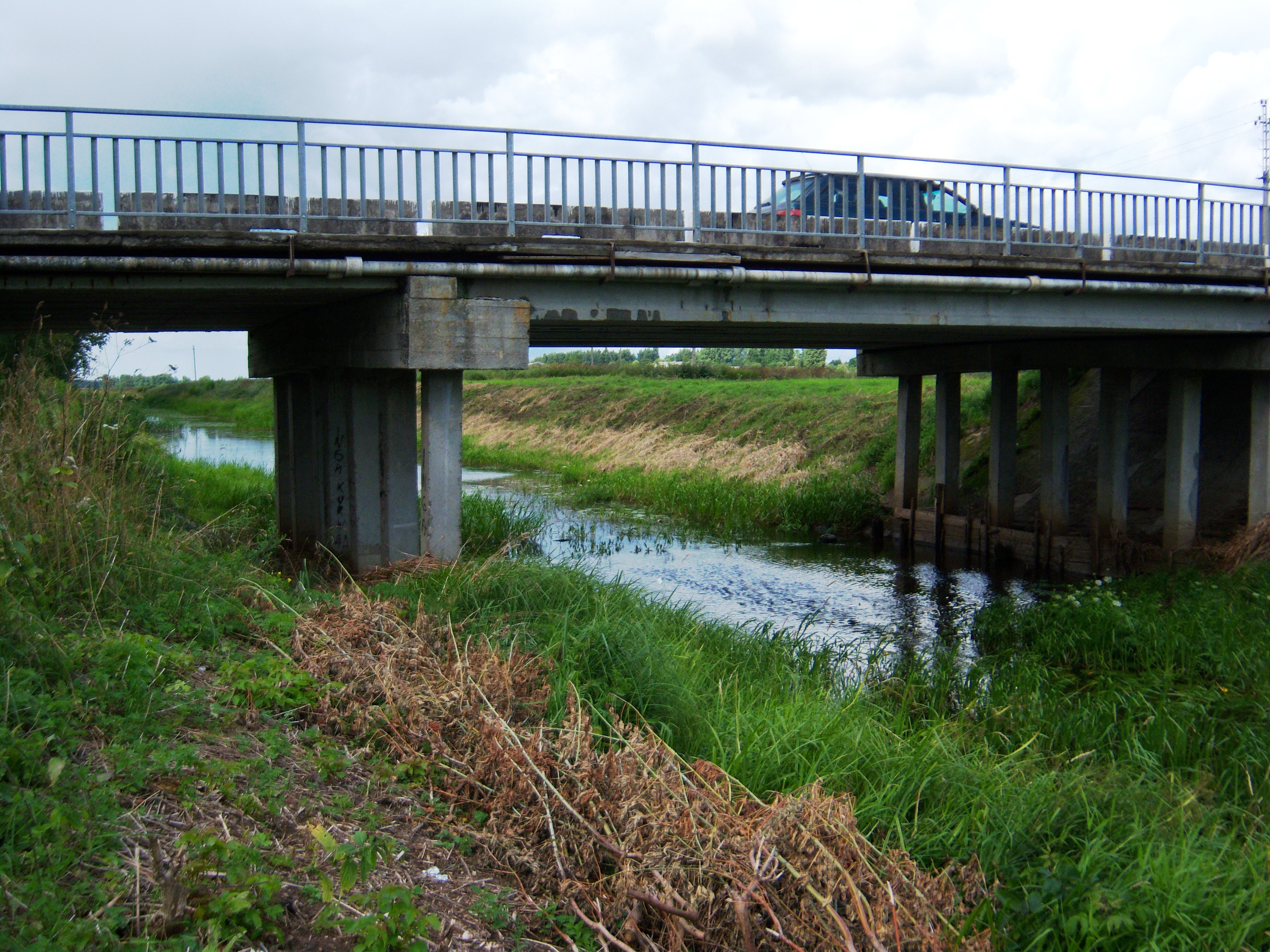
Nevėžis River
