= Paul Trewhela =

South African writer and political activist (born 1941)

- Born: 1941 (age 84–85); Johannesburg, South Africa
- Occupations: Journalist, writer
- Years active: 1960s–present
- Known for: Investigative journalism, political writing
- Notable work: Inside Quatro
- Awards: St Michael Award (2007)

Paul Trewhela (born 1941) is a South African journalist and a former political prisoner. He is the author of Inside Quatro.

== Early life and career ==
Trewhela was born in Johannesburg, South Africa, in 1941, educated at Michaelhouse in KwaZulu-Natal.

Trewhela worked in underground journalism with Ruth First and edited the underground journal of Umkhonto we Sizwe, Freedom Fighter, during the Rivonia Trial. He was a political prisoner in Pretoria and the Johannesburg Fort as a member of the South African Communist Party (SACP) in 1964–1967, separating from the SACP while in prison. In exile in Britain, he was co-editor with the late Baruch Hirson of Searchlight South Africa, which was banned in South Africa.

In regard to his ideology Trewhela has stated: "I was a Trotskyist, and, yes, a 'committed Marxist' through to the end of working on Searchlight South Africa. But I'm not a Marxist any longer. Marx's conception of the 'dictatorship of the proletariat' gave a licence to totalitarian dictators of all kinds, and Marxism's economic determinism and alleged 'scientific' philosophy are way off beam. I'm much more aware than before how fragile are the little shoots of civil society, and how they need nurturing, and how easily they are crushed by very ideological people who claim to have a universal panacea, usually violent. They're the dangerous people in southern Africa, as Robert Mugabe and his regime have shown."

== Honours ==
In 2007 he received the St Michael Award from his alma-mater, Michaelhouse.

== Publications ==
- "Chapter 8 The Problem of Communism in Southern Africa". Inside Quatro: Uncovering the Exile History of the ANC and SWAPO. Jacana Media. 2009. ISBN 978-1-77009-776-6.
- Inside Quatro: Uncovering the Exile History of the ANC and SWAPO. Jacana Media. 2009. ISBN 978-1-77009-776-6.
- "Swapo and the churches: an international scandal" (PDF). Searchlight South Africa. 2 (3): 65–88. 1991. Archived from the original (PDF) on 6 October 2014.
- Yengeni, Schreiner and the Ethics of the ANC. 2008.

== Notes and references ==
- Pogrund, Benjamin (2000). War of Words: Memoir of a South African Journalist. Seven Stories Press. ISBN 978-1-888363-71-5.
- Clingman, Stephen (15 September 2011). Bram Fischer: Afrikaner Revolutionary. International Pub Marketing. ISBN 978-0-86486-677-6.
- Anon (1975). "Torture in South Africa". Transition (50) (October 1975–March 1976 ed.). Indiana University Press: 52–57. doi:10.2307/2935000. JSTOR 2935000.
