= Circle Court, Johannesburg =

Circle Court
- Interactive map of the Circle Court area

General information
- Status: Completed
- Type: Residence apartments
- Location: Hillbrow, Johannesburg South Africa
- Coordinates: 26.20452°S 28.04224°E
- Completed: 1936

Height
- Roof: 102 metres (335 ft)

Design and construction
- Architects: Obel & Obel

Circle Court is a residential building in Johannesburg, Hillbrow was designed by the company of brothers Luis Theodore Obel and Mark Obel in 1936. They both favoured the Art Deco style of design. During the time when the building was constructed, Clarendon circle was a famous landmark with a large traffic circle surrounding an island of grass and palm trees, this was replaced by traffic lights in 1959. Louis lived in this building and died here in 1956.
