= Astor Mansions =

Art Deco building in South Africa

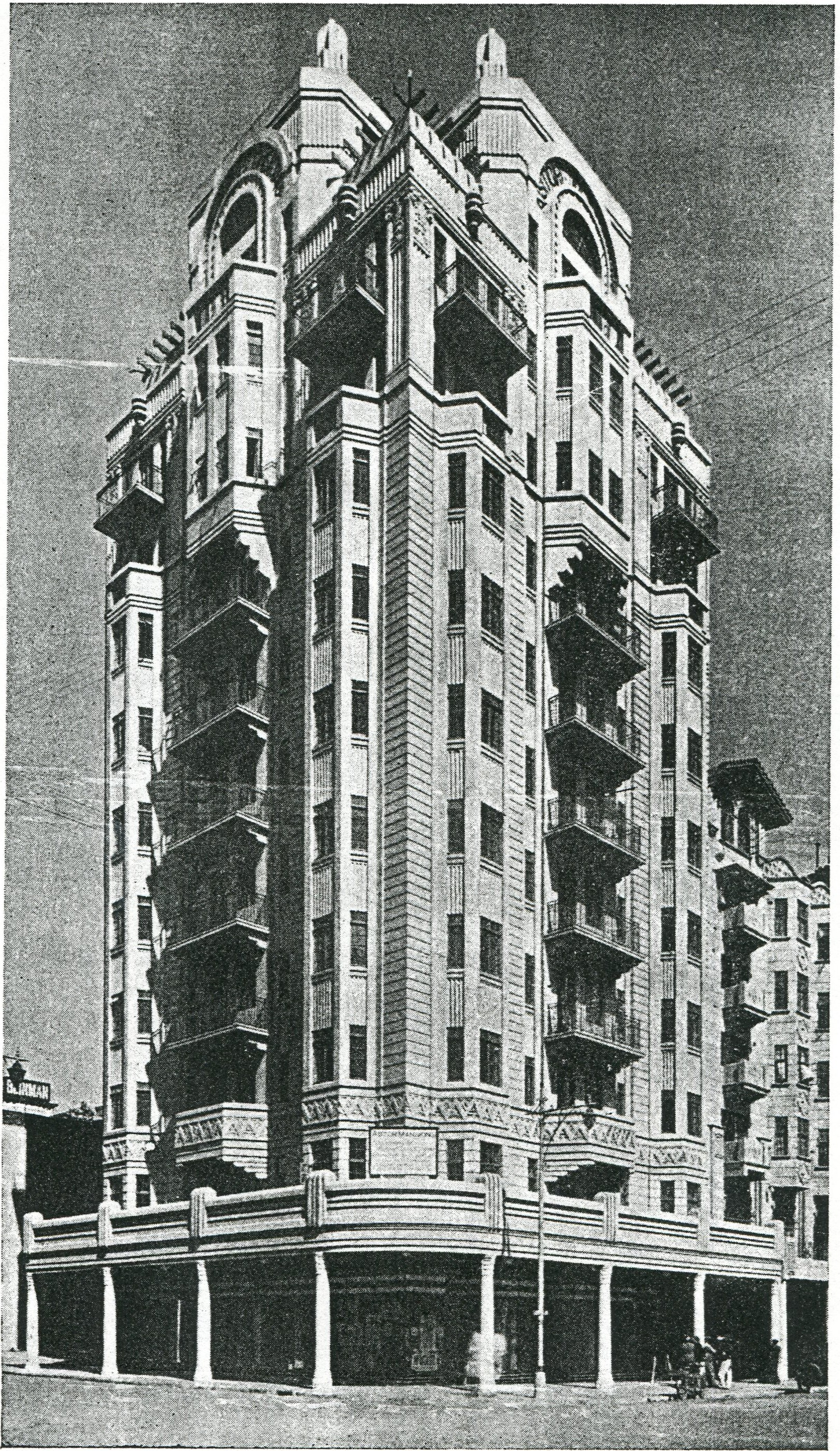
- Astor Mansions, cnr Jeppe and von Brandis Str in Johannesburg
- Interactive map of the Astor Mansions area

General information
- Status: Completed
- Location: Johannesburg, South Africa
- Coordinates: 26.2015°S 28.04415°E
- Completed: 1932

Height
- Roof: 102 metres (335 ft)

Technical details
- Floor count: 11

Design and construction
- Architect: Obel and Obel

Astor Mansions is an Art Deco style building that was designed by architects Obel & Obel in 1931 and completed in 1932. The building was residential with street level retail and first floor professional office space. It was built to the maximum height of 140 feet permitted by the City Council. The building had a short lived stint as the tallest building in Johannesburg until the completion of the Ansteys Building in 1935.

It is situated on stand 1094 on the corner of Jeppe and von Brandis Streets in Johannesburg. It is probably one of the city’s finest examples of New York Art Deco architecture. The building forms part of a collection of notable Art Deco corner buildings found along Jeppe Street, namely, Castle Mansions, Manner’s Mansions, and Anstey’s. Astor Mansions displays clear references to the Chrysler Building in New York, particularly the iconic curved zigzag. The name was inspired by the Waldorf Astoria New York, named for the "Astors", a wealthy American family who made their fortune through real estate, which was completed in the same year.

== Design ==
The form of the building is predominantly tall and angular except for the curved fascia over the corner entrance and the curved arch forms adorning the elevations at the top of the building. The angular form is accentuated by low relief horizontal banding and stepping in the facade, creating depth and shadows. Geometric friezes, stylized capitals, wrought iron balconies and fluted vertical elements provide further interest. The verticality and symmetry of the building are its defining characteristics, with the angular towers typifying skyscraper architecture of the period, with a clear reference to Manhattan, New York, where the Astor family lived.

== Construction ==
The building is constructed in brick with a concrete roof. The elevations are plastered and painted with sculptural detailing. Steel window frames were used, all of which were originally painted using ‘Gnudek’ high gloss paint.

== Heritage status ==
The Astor Mansions building is historically and culturally significant for the following reasons:

- The Astor Mansions is associated with the architectural firm of Obel & Obel
- The building is of high architectural quality
- Astor Mansions is a landmark Art Deco building, which was once the tallest building in Johannesburg
- Astor Mansions is a good example of a building where Art Deco ornamentation as well as decorative panels have been used. The tower is unique in the Johannesburg architectural scene
