= Baruch Hirson =

South African political activist, academic, author and historian

- Born: December 10, 1921; Johannesburg, South Africa
- Died: October 3, 1999 (aged 77); London, England
- Occupations: Activist; author; historian; academic
- Years active: 1940–1995

Baruch Hirson (10 December 1921 – 3 October 1999) was a South African political activist, academic, author, and historian, who was jailed for nine years in apartheid-era South Africa before moving to England in 1973. He was co-founder of the critical journal Searchlight South Africa, and in 1991, a critic of what he referred to as Stalinist methods used by the African National Congress (ANC).

== Life ==
Baruch Hirson was born to a lower-middle class Jewish family in Doornfontein, Johannesburg. His parents, Joseph and Lily Hirson, had emigrated to South Africa to escape antisemitism in the Russian Empire. From the age of four, Hirson attended a Hebrew school in Johannesburg. His mathematical ability enabled him to study as a part-time student at the University of Witwatersrand, matriculating in 1939.

In 1940, he joined Hashomer Hatzair, the radical Zionist youth movement. Encountering organized antisemitism from the Greyshirts and those celebrating the centenary of the Great Trek, he moved towards Marxism, joining the Fourth International Organisation of South Africa (FIOSA). Influenced against Stalinism by reading Workers' Front (1938), Fenner Brockway's account of the Spanish Civil War, he became a Trotskyist.

From 1944 to 1946, Hirson was full-time-organiser for the Workers' International League, a short-lived Trotskyist group, trying to develop black trade unions despite the Suppression of Communism Act. He came to know other South African Trotskyists such as M. N. Averbach, Hosea Jaffe, Yudel Burlak and Raff Lee. When the WIL stopped working with unions, Hirson was involved for a while with the Non-European Unity Movement (NEUM).

In 1950, he joined the Congress of Democrats, the white wing of the ANC-led Congress Alliance, organizing a new Socialist League of Africa. After the Sharpeville Massacre Hirson felt discouraged by the political failure to combat apartheid and in 1960 he wrote a critique of the movement, called 10 Years of the Stay at Home.

In the early 1960s, Hirson organized a National Committee for Liberation, later known as the African Resistance Movement (ARM), with other Trotskyists and younger members of the ANC. The group carried out sabotage actions, and in 1964 Hirson was arrested, convicted of sabotage, and jailed for nine years. During his time in Pretoria Central Prison, he met Denis Goldberg, and helped Goldberg to communicate with ANC members on the outside via coded letters. These communications helped to effect the prison escape of Tim Jenkin, Stephen Lee and Alex Moumbaris in 1979 (later the subject of the film Escape from Pretoria).

Released in 1973, but facing a banning order and house arrest, Hirson and his family moved to England. There he found posts at the University of Bradford and then Middlesex Polytechnic where he lectured in politics, and in 1986, he enrolled for a PhD in history. Beginning with Year of fire, year of ash, a record of the Soweto uprising, Hirson wrote a series of works on the history of the left and the anti-apartheid struggle in South Africa. He collaborated with Hillel Ticktin of Critique, and founded the critical journal Searchlight South Africa with Paul Trewhela.

In 1991, Hirson returned to visit South Africa, speaking at eight universities with the demand that "use of Stalinist methods in the ANC" be exposed and stopped.

In 1995, his biography of the Welsh communist and opponent of apartheid, David Ivon Jones, was published.

He died in London in 1999, aged 77, from the cumulative effects of a long-term degenerative paralysis of the bone structure, one of several health problems exacerbated by his imprisonment.

== Recognition ==
In March 2011, the country of Sierra Leone issued a postage stamp in his honor, naming him as one of the Legendary Heroes of Africa.

== Works ==
- '10 Years of the Stay at Home', International Socialism, 1961
- Year of fire, year of ash: the Soweto revolt, roots of a revolution, 1979
- Yours for the union!: class and community struggles in South Africa, 1930-1947, 1989
- Colonialism and Imperialism p. 7–18 in Searchlight South Africa, Vol 2, No 3, July 1991
- Strike across the Empire: the seamen's strike of 1925 : in Britain, South Africa and Australasia, 1992
- Revolutions in my life, 1995
- The delegate for Africa: David Ivon Jones, 1883-1924, 1995
- The Cape Town intellectuals: Ruth Schechter and her circle, 1907-1934, 2000
- Frank Glass: the restless revolutionary, 2003
- A history of the Left in South Africa: writings of Baruch Hirson, 2005
