= Orchards Primary School =

Primary school in Orchards, Johannesburg, South Africa

Orchards Primary School is a primary school in Orchards, a suburb of Johannesburg, South Africa.

The school was founded in 1928 as the Norwood Afrikaans Language School. In 1929, the name was changed to the Orchards Afrikaner Primary School, but in 1933 they settled on the name Dirkie Uys Primary School, after the famed Voortrekker. The school maintained the name until 2000, serving students from surrounding suburbs as well such as Norwood, Oaklands, Victoria, Orange Grove, and Sydenham.

In 1994, the school had 165 students. In 1995, the school adopted the parallel-medium model, teaching in Afrikaans and English side by side, and by 1997 the student body had reached 253 between the separate classes. Christo Lodder was principal from 1992 to 1998, when the model was instituted. In 2000, the school's name was changed to Orchards Primary School, and it became English-only.
