= Louis Botha Avenue =

Road in Johannesburg, South Africa

Metropolitan route M11

Route information
- Maintained by Johannesburg Roads Agency and Department of Roads and Transport (Gauteng)
- Length: 5.75 mi (9.25 km)
- Existed: 1880s–present

Major junctions
- South end: Clarendon Place/Willie Street, Hillbrow
- M31 Houghton Drive, Houghton; M31 Joe Slovo Drive, Berea; M16 1st Ave, Houghton; M16 8th St, Orange Grove; R25 11 Ave/Louis Road, Orchards; M20 Athol St, Highlands North; M30 Corlett Dr, Bramley; M40 Artwright Ave, Wynberg
- North end: Artwright Ave, Wynberg

Location
- Country: South Africa

Highway system
- Numbered routes of South Africa

Louis Botha Avenue (part of Johannesburg Metropolitan Route M11) is a major street in Johannesburg, South Africa. Originally part of the main road between central Johannesburg and Pretoria, it runs along through the north-eastern parts of the city from Hillbrow to Sandton, passing through numerous older suburbs, including Houghton and Orange Grove, before it becomes the Pretoria Main Road at Wynberg (bypassing the Alexandra Township) and continues to Midrand and Pretoria.

== Route ==
Louis Botha Ave, which is part of the M11 metropolitan route, begins at the top of the Johannesburg CBD in the suburbs of Hillbrow and Berea at the Clarendon Place and Willie Street junction and then heads north-east passing between Houghton to the north and Yeoville and Bellevue to the south. In Houghton it passes close to the private boys schools of St John's College (1889) and King Edward VII school (1911). After this point the road curves and is ominously nicknamed Deathbend due to the number of car accidents at the spot. The route then enters the suburb of Orange Grove, passing the new Victory Theatre (2007), the older one torn down in 2005 which has its origins as a cinema in 1929 and renamed after the end of World War II as the Victory and became a theatre in the early nineties. Radium Beer Hall is on the right. Midway through Orange Grove, the road bends northwards and passes through Orchards and Sydenham and the smaller suburbs of Maryvale, Forbesdale, Cheltondale, Rouxville and Hawkins Estate. The road then crosses the M20 at Atholl Road in the suburbs of Highlands North and Waverley. The road crosses Corlett Drive in Bramley before ending a short distance later at the Artwright Avenue (M40) junction in the light industrial suburb of Wynberg with the old township of Alexandra to the east. The road, still designated as the M11, continues on northwards as the Pretoria Main Road.

== History ==
The roadway originates as far back as 1876 as a wagon track connecting the farms south of the ridge with South African Republic's (ZAR) capital, at Pretoria. The road would pass through Halfway House (now known as Midrand) before heading to Pretoria. Halfway House was laid out in 1890 and became the halfway mark between the two towns on the Zeedeberg coach route. The roadway has its beginnings at the apex of triangular piece of unused government land at Randjelaagte in what is now the suburbs of Hillbrow and Berea. The apex is remembered by the Randjelaagte Beacon at the top of Clarendon Place. The road then headed north-east along the boundaries of the old Witwatersrand farms Klipfontein to the north and Doornfontein to the south before peeling away through the former as it drops down from the ridge crossing the small Lemoen Spruit (Orange Grove Spruit) and into the northern valley. At the bottom of the ridge the road would pass the Lemoen Plaas a farm where travelers would rest. Gold was discovered south of the ridge in 1886 and by 1889 a hotel called the Orange Grove Hotel appeared close to the old farm and was an excursion point for the early town residents. During the Second Boer War, after the British Army captured Johannesburg, a British block-house was built alongside the road near the bottom of the ridge overlooking the valley protecting the town from the Boer forces. It was still visible in 1909.

The land around this area, called Alexandra Estate would be renamed as Orange Grove in 1904 and the suburb was laid out by the African Realty Trust. In 1909 a tram line from Johannesburg would be laid down the road and would terminate in the suburb of Sydenham. The old Pretoria road obtained its existing name in 1917 when it was named after the prime minister and Boer-War general, Louis Botha. On 3 July 1917, the Federation of Ratepayers Association recommended to the City of Johannesburg that two main roads in Johannesburg be named after Louis Botha and Jan Smuts, in honour of their service to the British Empire during World War I. The council voted and Morgan Road and Pretoria Main Road became Louis Botha Avenue.

== Developments ==
A largely business street, there are some problems on Louis Botha Avenue, including urban decay caused by illegal land uses, such as shebeens. In 2014, construction began on the expansion of Johannesburg's Rea Vaya bus rapid transit system to Louis Botha Avenue.
