= Carl Garré =

Swiss surgeon (1857–1928)

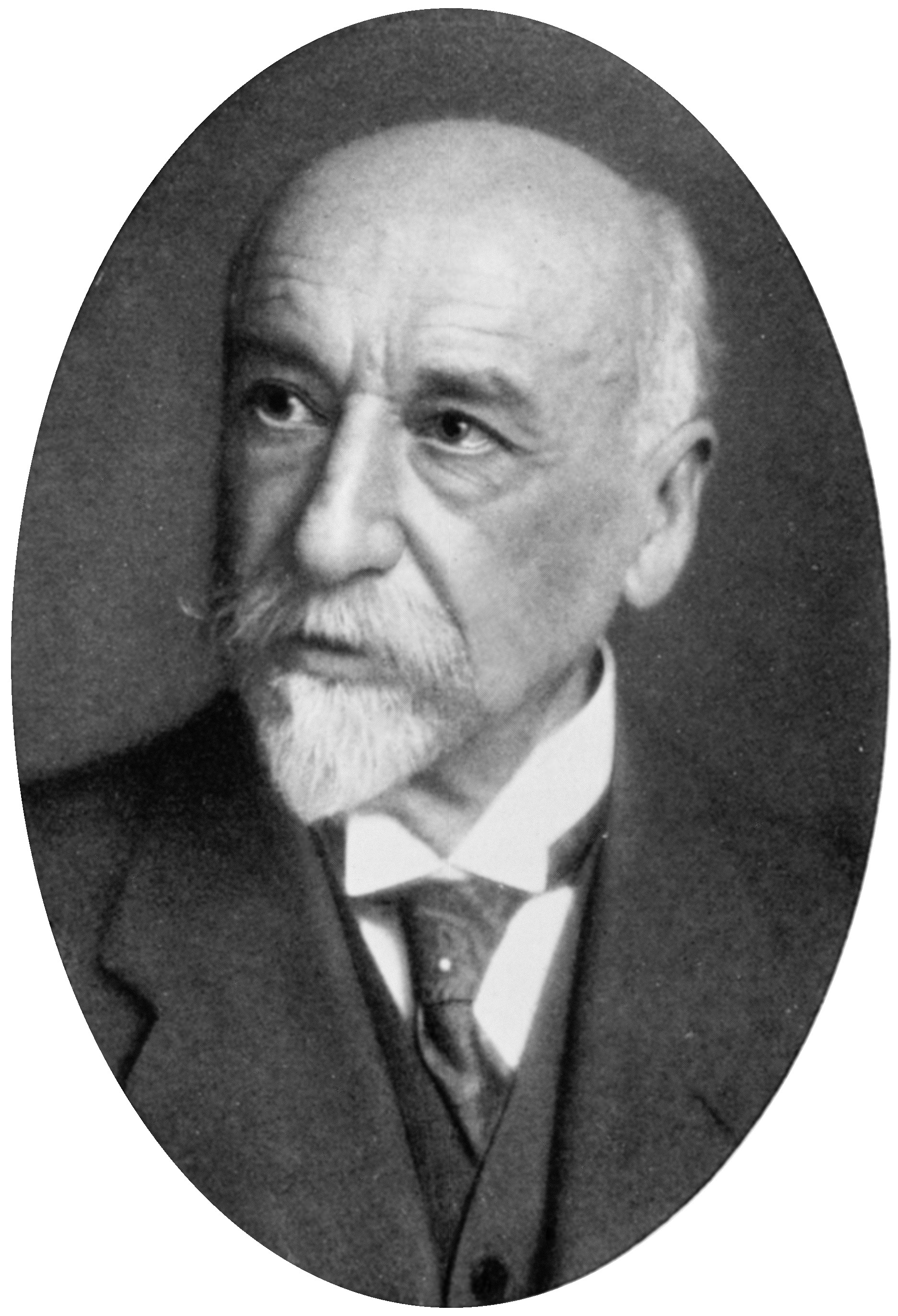
Carl Alois Philipp Garrè

Carl Alois Philipp Garrè (12 December 1857, Ragaz – 6 March 1928) was a Swiss surgeon. He proved that Staphylococcus aureus causes carbuncles and boils by experimenting on himself and had one condition named after himself, Garre's sclerosing osteomyelitis (sclerosing osteitis – form of chronic osteomyelitis with proliferative periostitis). He was a student of Robert Koch and Theodor Kocher.

He studied medicine at the Universities of Bern and Leipzig, earning his doctorate in 1883. From 1884 he was an assistant to surgeon August Socin (1837–1899) at the University of Basel, where in 1886 he became privat-docent for surgery and bacteriology. In 1889 he became an associate professor of surgery at the University of Tübingen. From 1894 he was a full professor of surgery at several universities, including the Universities of Rostock (1894–1901) and Bonn (1907–1926). He died in Puerto de la Cruz, Tenerife on March 6, 1928.

== Selected writings ==
- Grundriss der Lungenchirurgie (Outline of lung surgery) 1903, with Heinrich Irenaeus Quincke (1842–1922).
- Lehrbuch der Chirurgie (Textbook of surgery) 1920, with August Borchard (1864–1940).
