= Oaklands, Gauteng =

Oaklands
- Location within Gauteng Location within South Africa
- Coordinates: 26°08′58″S 28°04′03″E
- Country: South Africa
- Province: Gauteng
- Municipality: City of Johannesburg
- Main Place: Johannesburg

Area
  - Total: 1.01 km^{2} (0.39 sq mi)

Population (2011)
  - Total: 1,963
  - Density: 1,940/km^{2} (5,030/sq mi)

Racial makeup (2011)
  - Black African: 32.7%
  - Coloured: 1.7%
  - Indian/Asian: 7.8%
  - White: 56.7%
  - Other: 1.1%

First languages (2011)
  - English: 72.9%
  - Afrikaans: 5.5%
  - Zulu: 4.8%
  - Tswana: 3.3%
  - Other: 13.4%
- Time zone: UTC+2 (SAST)
- Postal code (street): 4339
- PO box: 4345
- Area code: 2190

Oaklands is an affluent suburb of Johannesburg, South Africa. It is located in Johannesburg Region E. It is a small suburb surrounded by the suburbs of Houghton Estate, Norwood, Orchards, The Gardens and Highlands North.

== History ==
Oaklands came into existence in 1896. The lands owner prior to it being surveyed as a township was William Anderson Martin and purchased in 1896, consisting of 18 acres of what is now known as Oaklands and Orchards. Martin would own a large house in suburb called Avonmore a would live there until his death in 1960.

The eastern border of the suburb, bounded by Orchards is separated by a seasonal spruit (stream) that has its source in the Houghton Golf Club and with a possible further source on the ridge above Louis Botha Avenue close to Fellside. Most of the stream through the suburb is now either underground or canalized with it eventually forming up with the Orange Grove Spruit and entering the Sandspruit river.
