= Forbesdale =

- Location within Gauteng Location within South Africa
- Coordinates: 26.152°S 28.082°E
- Country: South Africa
- Province: Gauteng
- Municipality: City of Johannesburg
- Established: 1963

Area
  - Total: 0.23 km^{2} (0.089 sq mi)

Population (2001)
  - Total: 649
  - Density: 2,800/km^{2} (7,300/sq mi)
- Time zone: UTC+2 (SAST)
- Postal code (street): 2192

Forbesdale is a suburb of Johannesburg, South Africa. It is a tiny northern suburb tucked between Orchards, Maryvale and Cheltondale. It is located in Region E of the City of Johannesburg Metropolitan Municipality.

== History ==
Prior to the discovery of gold on the Witwatersrand in 1886, the suburb lay on land on one of the original farms called Klipfontein. It became a suburb on 24 July 1963 and the suburb name originates from two developers, Forbes Properties and Robert Forbes & Sons.
