= Talboton =

- Talboton's location in Gauteng
- Coordinates: 26°08′40″S 28°05′40″E
- Country: South Africa
- Province: Gauteng
- City: Johannesburg
- Established: November 22, 1944

Area
  - Total: 0.08 km^{2} (0.031 sq mi)

Population (2011)
  - Total: 440
  - Density: 5,500/km^{2} (14,000/sq mi)

Races
  - White: 60.7%
  - Asian: 2.7%
  - Cape Coloured: 2.7%
  - Black: 33.6%
  - Other: 0.2%

Languages
  - English: 72.9%
  - Zulu: 8.1%
  - Tswana: 4.4%
  - Xhosa: 4.1%
  - Other: 10.6%

Talboton is a suburb of Johannesburg, South Africa, around 7 km northeast of City Hall.

It covers 0.08 km² across three blocks and a row of houses on Boundary Road. It borders Percelia Estate to the north, Fairmount to the east, Raedene Estate to the south, and Rouxville and Highlands North to the west. Talboton was established as plot No. 139 of Klipfontein Farm on November 22, 1944. The owner of the township, John Talbot Rowe, named it after himself.

== Sources ==
- Raper, Peter Edmund (2004). New Dictionary of South African Place Names. Johannesburg/Cape Town: Jonathan Ball Publishers.
- Stals, Prof. Dr. E.L.P (ed.) (1978). Afrikaners in die Goudstad, vol. 1: 1886 - 1924. Cape Town/Pretoria: HAUM.
