= Borchard =

Borchard is a German language surname. It stems from the male given name Burchard – and may refer to:

- Adolphe Borchard (1882–1967), French pianist and composer
- August Borchard (1864–1940), German physician and surgeon
- Beatrix Borchard (1950), German musicologist and author
- Edwin Borchard (1884–1951), international legal scholar and jurist
- Herminia Borchard Dassel (1821–1857), German-American painter
- Ian Borchard (1957), former Australian rules footballer
- Joe Borchard (1978), American former Major League Baseball (MLB) outfielder
- Leo Borchard (1899–1945), German-Russian conductor
- Ruth Borchard (1910–2000), British writer

== See also ==
- SS Richard Borchard, cargo ship which was built as Celia in 1943
- Borchard Community Park, a public park located in western Newbury Park
