= Rouxville, Johannesburg =

Rouxville
- Rouxville's location in Gauteng
- Coordinates: 26°09′00″S 28°05′20″E
- Country: South Africa
- Province: Gauteng
- City: Johannesburg

Area
  - Total: 0.23 km^{2} (0.089 sq mi)

Population (2011)
  - Total: 1,366
  - Density: 5,939/km^{2} (15,380/sq mi)

Races
  - White: 39.6%
  - Asian: 1.8%
  - Cape Coloured: 2.3%
  - Black: 55.3%
  - Other: 0.9%

Languages
  - English: 47.4%
  - Zulu: 18.5%
  - Northern Sotho: 6.0%
  - Southern Ndebele: 5.6%
  - Other: 22.5%

Rouxville is a suburb of Johannesburg, South Africa, around 8 kilometres (5.0 mi) northeast of City Hall.

Rouxville covers 0.22 square kilometres (0.085 sq mi) in the shape of an upside-down triangle, borders Highlands North to the north, Raedene Estate to the northeast, Sydenham, Bagleyston to the southwest, and Hawkins Estate to the northwest.

It was founded in 1896 on part of the farm known as Klipfontein, and its name comes from the Jacobus Petrus Roux (1865–1929), who sold the land to F.D.J. Viljoen in 1895. Like much of northeastern Johannesburg, it was predominantly English-speaking.

== Sources ==
- Raper, Peter Edmund (2004). New Dictionary of South African Place Names. Johannesburg/Cape Town: Jonathan Ball Publishers.
- Stals, Prof. Dr. E.L.P (ed.) (1978). Afrikaners in die Goudstad, vol. 1: 1886 - 1924. Cape Town/Pretoria: HAUM.
