= Fairwood =

Fairwood may refer to:

== Place names ==
=== South Africa ===
- Fairwood, Gauteng, a suburb of Johannesburg

=== United Kingdom ===
- Fairwood, Swansea, an electoral ward of Swansea, Wales
- Fairwood, Wiltshire, a hamlet in England
- Fairwood Common, an area of common land in the Gower Peninsula, Wales

=== United States ===
- Fairwood, Maryland, a census-designated place
- Fairwood, Spokane County, Washington, a census-designated place in Spokane County
- Fairwood, King County, Washington, a census-designated place in King County
- Robandee-Fairwood, a neighborhood of Kansas City, Missouri, South Kansas City

== Other uses ==
- Fairwood (restaurant), fast-food restaurant chain in Hong Kong and China
- Fairwood Press, American publishing company
- SS Fairwood, a Hansa A Type cargo ship in service 1960-63
