= Chassidim Shul =

Former Chabad synagogue in Johannesburg, South Africa

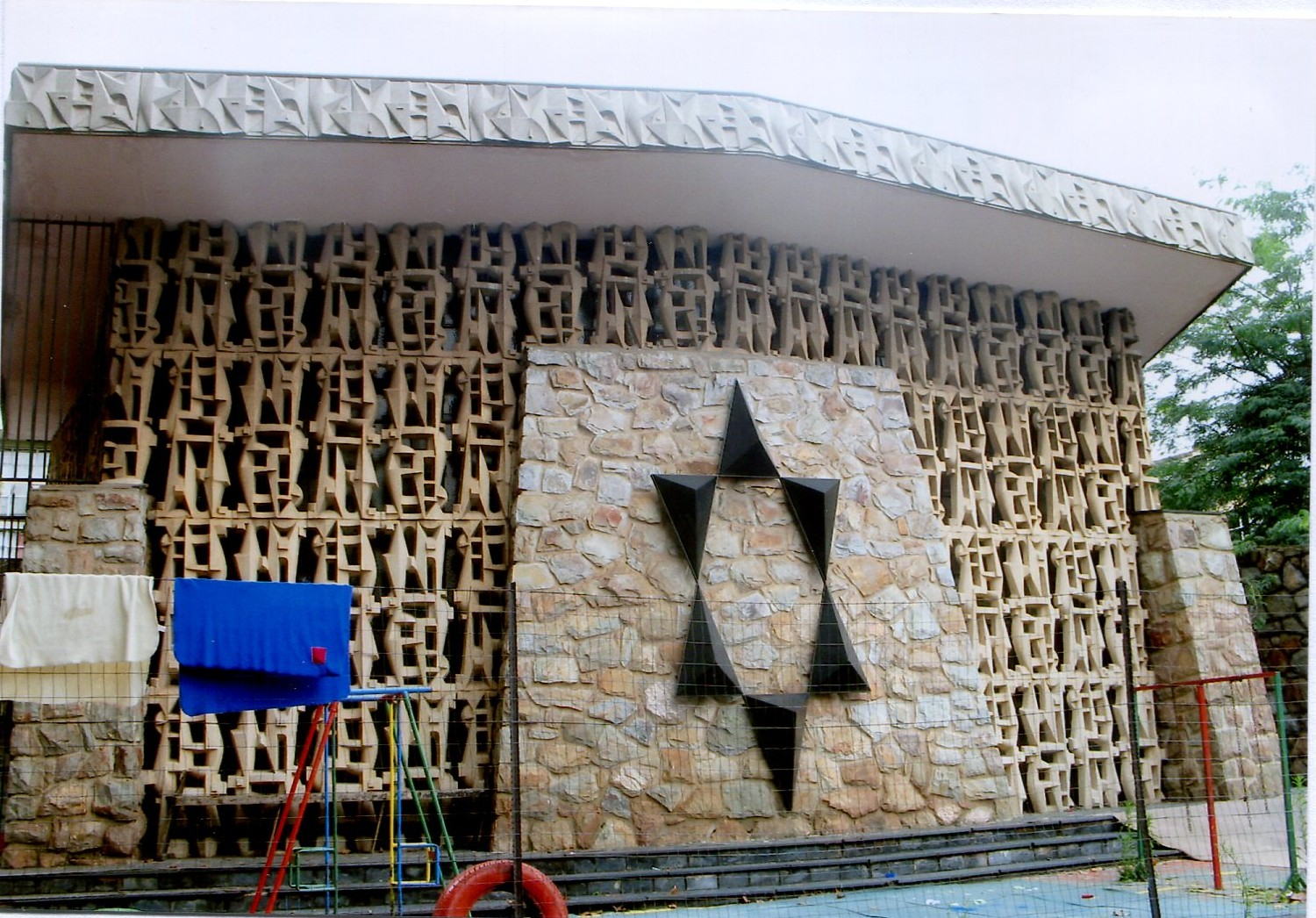
- The former synagogue, in 2014

- Location of the former synagogue in Greater Johannesburg

Religion
- Affiliation: Hasidic Judaism (former)
- Rite: Nusach Ashkenaz
- Ecclesiastical or organisational status: Synagogue (1963–????)
- Status: Active

Location
- Location: Yeoville, Johannesburg, Gauteng
- Country: South Africa
- Coordinates: 26°09′17″S 28°05′07″E

Architecture
- Architects: Morgensten & Morgensten
- Type: Synagogue architecture
- Style: Modernist
- Completed: 1963
- Direction of façade: East

The Chassidim Shul, also known as the Chabad House, is a former Hasidic Jewish congregation and synagogue in Yeoville, Johannesburg, in the district of Gauteng, South Africa. In 2025, the congregation established a new shul at the Hebrew Order of David centre in Orchards.

== History ==
The cornerstone was laid in 1963 by Mr Henry Jacobson, in memory of his parents, long-standing members of the Chassidic community. The building committee included Rabbi Aloy, obm, Mr Shaul Bacher, obm, Mr Mitzie Yachad and others. The Shul was finished about a year later.

The synagogue was completed in 1963 and designed by the firm of Morgensten & Morgensten, the husband and wife team of Jacques Morgenstern and Riva Morgenstern. They met at the University of the Witwatersrand in the Department of Architecture in the 1940s and ran a successful and award-winning architectural practice in Johannesburg. In 1963 the building received the prestigious Institute of Architects Award for the best ecclesiastical building.

The Chassidim Shul served as a place of worship and study and other activities of Chabad-Lubavitch. It was famous for its Shabbat farbrengens and extraordinary Chassidic joy and dancing on Simchat Torah.

The synagogue in Yeoville led to the establishment of more than a dozen Chabad synagogues across Johannesburg, Natal, and the Cape, introducing Lubavitch and the Rebbe's teachings to the local Jewish population.

With the change in demographics in Yeoville, the building is no longer in use as a synagogue. The congregation relocated to 27 Aintree Avenue, in the Savoy Estate of Johannesburg. In 2025, the congregation opened its new shul at the Hebrew Order of David centre in Orchards.

== Design ==
It is notable externally for its vigorous, sculptural nature. The roof is a heavy V-shape protecting the simple shape of the building which consists of an enclosure by screens of different density and transparency – warm-coloured stone and modelled grilles and facings in terrazzo by the sculptor Edoardo Villa.

The mystic lions of brass and bronze over the Holy Ark inside the building were also by Villa but these have since been removed. Villa worked on a number of Morgenstern and Morgenstern's other buildings.

== See also ==
- History of the Jews in South Africa
- List of synagogues in South Africa
