= Fellside =

Fellside may refer to:

- Fellside, Gauteng, South Africa
- Fellside, Kendal, England
- Fellside, Tyne and Wear, England

== See also ==
- Fellside Records
- Fell Side
