= Mycobacterium monacense =

Scientific classification
- Domain: Bacteria
- Kingdom: Bacillati
- Phylum: Actinomycetota
- Class: Actinomycetes
- Order: Mycobacteriales
- Family: Mycobacteriaceae
- Genus: Mycobacterium
- Species: M. monacense

Binomial name
- Mycobacterium monacense Reischl et al. 2006, DSM 44395

Species of bacterium

Mycobacterium monacense is a yellow-pigmented, non-photochromogenic species of mycobacterium named after Monacum, the Latin name of the German city Munich where the first strain was isolated. It grows in less than a week on solid medium.

Phylogenetic analysis has shown that this strain is most closely related to Mycobacterium doricum.

== Description ==
It is thought to be responsible for a severe, post-traumatic wound infection, reported in a healthy boy.

== Type strain ==
- First isolated in Munich, Germany

Strain B9-21-178 = CIP 109237 = DSM 44395.
