= Gresswold =

- Location within Gauteng Location within South Africa
- Coordinates: 26°07′51″S 28°05′15″E
- Country: South Africa
- Province: Gauteng
- Municipality: City of Johannesburg
- Main Place: Johannesburg
- Established: 1953

Area
  - Total: 0.38 km^{2} (0.15 sq mi)

Population (2011)
  - Total: 1,442
  - Density: 3,800/km^{2} (9,800/sq mi)

Racial makeup (2011)
  - Black African: 58.4%
  - Coloured: 5.3%
  - Indian/Asian: 9.0%
  - White: 25.5%
  - Other: 1.7%

First languages (2011)
  - English: 46.7%
  - Zulu: 11.3%
  - Tswana: 6.9%
  - Northern Sotho: 5.2%
  - Other: 29.8%
- Time zone: UTC+2 (SAST)
- Postal code (street): 2090

Gresswold is a suburb of Johannesburg, South Africa. A small suburb in northern Johannesburg, it is surrounded by Bramley, Savoy Estate, Kew and Bramley Gardens. It is located in Region E of the City of Johannesburg Metropolitan Municipality.

== History ==
The suburb is situated on part of an old Witwatersrand farm called Syferfontein. It would be proclaimed as suburb on 28 October 1953 and was named after the land owner, H. Dare who owned a hotel called Greswolde in Warwickshire.
