= Orange Grove, Gauteng =

Place in Johannesburg, South Africa

Orange Grove
- Location within Gauteng Location within South Africa
- Coordinates: 26.161°S 28.087°E
- Country: South Africa
- Province: Gauteng
- Municipality: City of Johannesburg
- Main Place: Johannesburg
- Established: 1902

Area
  - Total: 1.37 km^{2} (0.53 sq mi)

Population (2011)
  - Total: 7,751
  - Density: 5,660/km^{2} (14,700/sq mi)

Racial makeup (2011)
  - Black African: 55.3%
  - Coloured: 3.4%
  - Indian/Asian: 4.2%
  - White: 36.1%
  - Other: 1.0%

First languages (2011)
  - English: 47.9%
  - Zulu: 13.7%
  - Northern Sotho: 5.6%
  - Tswana: 5.1%
  - Other: 27.6%
- Time zone: UTC+2 (SAST)
- Postal code (street): 2192
- PO box: 2119

Orange Grove is a suburb of Johannesburg, South Africa. It is located in Region E of the City of Johannesburg Metropolitan Municipality.

== History ==
The original name of Orange Grove was Lemoen Plaas, Afrikaans for Orange Farm, as the description of the area and its original use prior to development and incorporation into the city of Johannesburg.

The orange trees of what became Orange Grove were planted by J.C.Esterhusen. His daughter was married to another Viljoen whose farmhouse became the original once-famous Orange Grove Hotel, located in the suburb. The hotel was built in 1888, and now the site is the location of a petrol service station.

Orange Grove is still home to The Radium Beerhall, Johannesburg's oldest surviving bar and grillhouse.

Famous former residents include Mohandas Gandhi, who stayed at 34 Grove Road in his early years of practising law in Johannesburg.

== Geography ==
=== Streetscape ===
The streets of the suburb are numerical, with the suffix of "street" heading west to east and "avenue" south to north. The only exceptions to this are Hope Road and Grove Road, bordering the suburb to the south.

Louis Botha Avenue, initially served as the only single, direct road between the Johannesburg CBD and Pretoria. It was principally the 'High Street' for Orange Grove. Louis Botha was also a direct link to Alexandra Township, where a large part of the work force which found employ in Orange Grove and surrounding suburbs, resided.

=== Communities ===
The surrounding suburbs are (clockwise from the north) Maryvale, Sydenham, Doornfontein 92 IR, Linksfield, Fairwood, Mountain View, Houghton Estate, Fellside, Victoria, Norwood and Orchards. There is a strong sense of community between Orange Grove and its surrounding areas. Most of the residents were blue collar citizens.

== Demographics ==
The suburb was informally and fondly known as Little Italy during the 1960s, 1970s and 1980s. This was in part because the majority of residents in Orange Grove were primarily Italians who had immigrated from Italy in search of work during the early 1950s. Portuguese, Jewish and Afrikaans cultures were also present albeit in smaller concentrations. Despite the fact that Orange Grove was colloquially known as 'Little Italy', the mixture of these cultures provided a truly cosmopolitan, European, feel on its main thoroughfare, Louis Botha Avenue, during any day of the week. The Italian Club, an important center for the ethnic community, relocated to Bedfordview in the 1980s, marking the beginning of the decline of Orange Grove as an ethnic enclave.

== Parks and greenspace ==
Orange Grove boasts a park which is frequented by residents from surrounding suburbs and in the past most of its residents would utilise Hoy Park Public Pools for recreation, in Sydenham. It is rare for a home to possess a pool in Orange Grove, but many more prominent dwellings in the area do have.

A popular place for children of the area to meet was Patterson Park, in front of the Norwood Police Flats. The area was previously a recreational hub, with pools, tennis courts, athletic lawns, and sporting fields. Today however the recreational facilities have been upgraded and brought into the modern era.

== Law and government ==
=== Crime ===
There was a decline in safety after 1994 as security became a problem in the area. Most of the previously manicured lawns and neat facades which were visible from the streets over low walls were replaced by high walls with electric fences, barbed wire and alarm systems. The Norwood Police Station, services the area. Most of the night clubs, cafes, restaurants and bioscopes (movie theaters) subsequently shut down.

== Education ==
Orange Grove possesses a library and two Primary Schools, Orange Grove Primary School and Linksfield Primary School. Traditionally, residents attended one of the two Primary Schools then moved to Highlands North High School for boys and Waverly Girls' High School for girls respectively. These four schools have serviced Orange Grove for over three generations and have withstood the rigours of political and social upheaval.
