= Bagleyston =

- Location within Gauteng Location within South Africa
- Coordinates: 26°9′2″S 28°5′13″E
- Country: South Africa
- Province: Gauteng
- Municipality: City of Johannesburg
- Main Place: Johannesburg
- Established: 1947

Area
  - Total: 0.11 km^{2} (0.042 sq mi)

Population (2011)
  - Total: 229
  - Density: 2,100/km^{2} (5,400/sq mi)

Racial makeup (2011)
  - Black African: 57.2%
  - Coloured: 1.7%
  - White: 35.8%
  - Other: 5.2%

First languages (2011)
  - English: 56.5%
  - Zulu: 12.6%
  - Southern Ndebele: 8.7%
  - Tswana: 6.5%
  - Other: 15.7%
- Time zone: UTC+2 (SAST)
- Postal code (street): 2192

Bagleyston is a suburb of Johannesburg, South Africa. It lies north-east of the Johannesburg CBD and is surrounded by Sydenham, Rouxville and Orchards. It is located in Region E of the City of Johannesburg Metropolitan Municipality.

== History ==
The suburb is situated on part of an old Witwatersrand farm called Klipfontein. It was established in 1947 and named after the original owner Herbert Bagley.
