= The Radium Beerhall =

Bar in South Africa

The Radium Beerhall is the oldest surviving bar and grill house in Johannesburg. It is located on the corner of Louis Botha Avenue and 9th Street in Orange Grove. It regularly hosts live music.

Originally The Radium, as it is also known, was a tea room owned by the Kalil family, when it opened in 1929. Thirteen years later, it acquired a Malt and liquor license and became a beerhall. During the first few years, it was notorious for illegally selling alcohol to black patrons in a white district.

Today, it is still a popular destination and arguably the only attraction to Orange Grove since its decline post 1994. It is regularly used as a filming destination for programs as well as advertisements.

The bar itself is over 100 years old and was the original bar from the Ferreirasdorp Hotel, in the city centre. The bar was relocated to the radium during the Second World War when the hotel was demolished to build the magistrates court’s .
