= Garre's sclerosing osteomyelitis =

- Other names: Proliferative periostitis
- Specialty: Infectious disease

Garre's sclerosing osteomyelitis is a type of chronic osteomyelitis also called periostitis ossificans and Garré's sclerosing osteomyelitis.

It is a rare disease. It mainly affects children and young adults. It is associated with a low grade infection, which may be due to dental caries (cavities in the teeth).

The body of the mandible may show irregular lucent/opaque changes with subperiosteal opaque layering along inferior border. It is a chronic osteomyelitis with subperiosteal bone and collagen deposition. There is no suppuration and sinus formation. It was first described by the Swiss surgeon Carl Garré and is named after him.
