= TV Portuguesa =

Defunct South African television channel

- Country: South Africa
- Broadcast area: South Africa
- Headquarters: Wynberg, Johannesburg

Programming
- Language: Portuguese
- Picture format: 4:3 SDTV

Ownership
- Owner: Telecom Productions Pty/Community Channel Pty

History
- Launched: 9 April 1989; 37 years ago
- Closed: 2005; 21 years ago

Availability

Terrestrial
- Sentech: M-Net and CSN's analogue encrypted transmitter network (varies)

TV Portuguesa was a South African television channel catering the Portuguese South African community. It was carried on a spare second frequency used by M-Net for its community-targeted CSN service; being later available on DStv, where, in its later years, was shown for four days a week. It was founded in 1989 by Viriato Barreto and shut down in the early 2000s, presumably due to the arrival of SIC Internacional's full-time service.

== History ==
=== Background ===
Viriato Barreto was born on 30 April 1941 in Inhambane, Mozambique, where he spent most of his early life. He shot a documentary during Mozambique's independence in 1975, Moçambique Documento Vivo, featuring the independence process and its first president Samora Machel. Following the independences of Angola and Mozambique in 1975, there was a mass exodus of Portuguese immigrants to South Africa, especially Johannesburg. When he moved there in 1974, he set up the first Portuguese film club in Johannesburg (Portuguese Films) which was also the first drive-in cinema to be open on Sundays (during apartheid, most businesses were forbidden from opening on Sundays), which rented the only private drive-in in the city at the time, Lang Largter. He later acquired the Carlton Cinema in downtown Johannesburg, which had to be requalified as an Indian cinema in order to obtain more flexible rules, as it was located in an area where whites did not circulate at night. The reconversion project was constantly delayed by the authorities.

On 5 January 1976, SABC TV started broadcasting, but only in English and Afrikaans. Television caused a heavy downfall to cinema and newspaper advertising revenues. In order to accommodate to the new reality, Barreto became RTP's correspondent for South Africa, while still managing Carlton. In 1978, he formed, alongside Carlos Sommer, Vídeo-Televisão Portuguesa/Canal 2 (at the time, South Africa only had one television channel), which rented videotapes featuring recordings of Brazilian television programmes, enabling the community to watch content in their language for the first time. On 1 October 1986, SABC's monopoly was broken when subscription service M-Net started broadcasting. Two years later, he solicited a plan to air Portuguese content for the community for three hours a week. At the time, RTP Internacional did not exist yet and the opening of television to the private sector was seen as an opportunity for Barreto. However, the plan was initially rejected by the juridical authorities as the M-Net license forbade the sale to external companies, per the South African law of the time. In order to obtain approval, he created two companies, Community Channel and Telecom Productions, both of which were part of the same holding (also named Telecom Productions). For non-shareholder chairman, he appointed Durval Marques of the Bank of Lisbon, a bank founded by the community. In order to receive approval from the government, he aligned with the leading National Party, in order to reach out to the relevant minister to find approval.

=== On air ===
TVP had to be set up with a number of conditions to M-Net, including the usage of some of its equipment and the installation of an ENG unit. Such investments required a sum of money, which Barreto did by selling his stakes at the advertising agency he worked at (Cohen Waite and Barreto). On 9 April 1989, after sixteen months of planning, TV Portuguesa started broadcasting, initially once a week, from 10:30am to 2pm on Sundays. At launch time, it had over 3,000 subscribers, hoping to reach 60,000 by year's end. Programmes were mostly imported from Portugal and Brazil, as well as a news magazine for the Portuguese community. Despite initial expectations, by November, six months after launching, the subscriber figures had only exceeded 10,000.

The launch of TV Portuguesa ignited another niche: specialist channels for European communities in South Africa. For this end, Barreto received a proposal from Anthony Bock in 1992, who opted to create a Jewish channel for the local Jewish community. His channel, Shalom TV, was partly funded by the Israeli government (Barreto and Bock even went to the government to find financial support) and offered Telecom a regular sponsor and television content. Shalom TV closed in 1986. In 1994, Barreto also launched a channel for the Greek community, which only lasted sixteen months due to difficulties obtaining television programmes from Greece. The success of TVP led to negotiations with the SABC to carry a free-to-air programme for members of the Portuguese community who could not afford an M-Net subscription. This led to the creation of A Janela Aberta, a 56-minute programme that first aired on 1 May 1996.

=== Effects of the launch of DStv and RTP Internacional ===
Still in 1995, Multichoice, parent company of M-Net, launched its digital satellite television service, DStv. With its arrival, one of the first channels on offer was a 24-hour feed of RTP Internacional. It came at a cost: gradually, TVP lost 30 to 40% of its subscribers, a trend which continued at a slower pace. Barreto continued to relay RTP Internacional's programmes and, as a side effect of the competition between both channels, increased the airtime of his channel on M-Net's CSN. By 2000, the content provider switched from RTP to SIC which provided it with its entertainment output, as well as its own local programmes and reruns of the Brazilian telenovela Barriga de Aluguer. Barreto later merged his two companies in 2001 (Portuguese TV Channel Limited and Community Channel Limited), forming Community Channel Pty.

=== Closure ===
The analogue equipment Barreto used to continue producing his channel for M-Net CSN was already beginning to weigh in on its old age, and in 2002, he proposed the creation of a weekly magazine produced in Johannesburg to air on RTP Internacional. The first África do Sul Contacto, with Barreto's involvement, aired there on 9 April 2003. This also led to the slow downfall of TV Portuguesa, which, at closing time, had 32,000 subscribers. The channel shut down in 2005.

SIC, its content provider in later years, had already launched SIC Internacional in Angola, Mozambique and South Africa in October 2000, while Globo (supplier of telenovelas) joined in June that year. Globo left the South African market after signing a deal with ZAP, a satellite operator whose coverage area is limited exclusively to Angola and Mozambique, both of which are entirely Lusophone markets.
