= Osteomyelitis =

Infection of the bones

- Other names: Bone infection
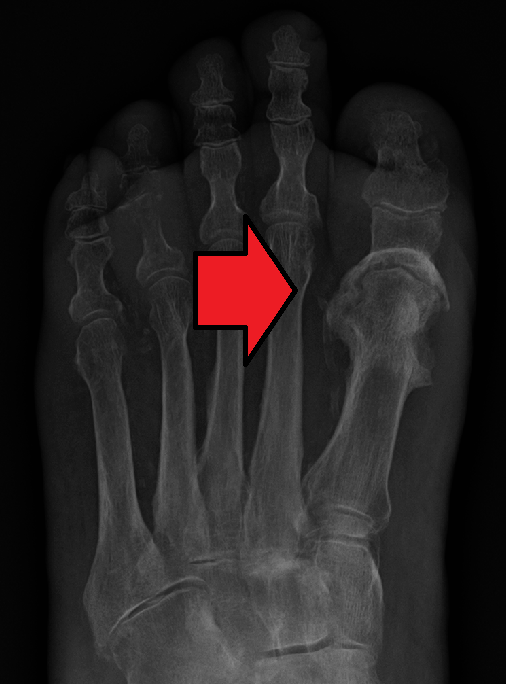
- Osteomyelitis of the 1st toe
- Specialty: Infectious disease, orthopedics
- Symptoms: Pain in a specific bone, overlying redness, fever, weakness
- Complications: Amputation
- Usual onset: Young or old
- Duration: Short or long term
- Causes: Bacterial, fungal
- Risk factors: Diabetes, intravenous drug use, prior removal of the spleen, trauma to the area
- Diagnostic method: Blood tests, medical imaging, bone biopsy
- Differential diagnosis: Charcot's joint, rheumatoid arthritis, infectious arthritis, giant cell tumor, cellulitis
- Treatment: Antimicrobials, surgery
- Prognosis: Low risk of death with treatment
- Frequency: 2.4 per 100,000 per year

Osteomyelitis (OM) is the infectious inflammation of bone. It may be acute or chronic and can be classified as hematogenous or non-hematogenous. It is commonly caused by bacterial infection, and in rare cases be due to fungal infection.

Symptoms are commonly non-specific but may include pain, swelling and redness around the affected area. In adults, the most commonly affected site is the spine and in pediatric populations the most commonly affected site is the long bones. Diagnosis is suspected on the basis of clinical presentation and aided by laboratory and imaging studies and made definitive by biopsy and culture of the presenting area. Treatment of bacterial OM involves antimicrobials and can involve surgery or even amputation. Outcomes are generally good when the condition has been present only a short time.

In humans, the condition was described as early as the 300s BC by Hippocrates. Prior to the availability of antibiotics, the risk of death was significant.

== Signs and symptoms ==
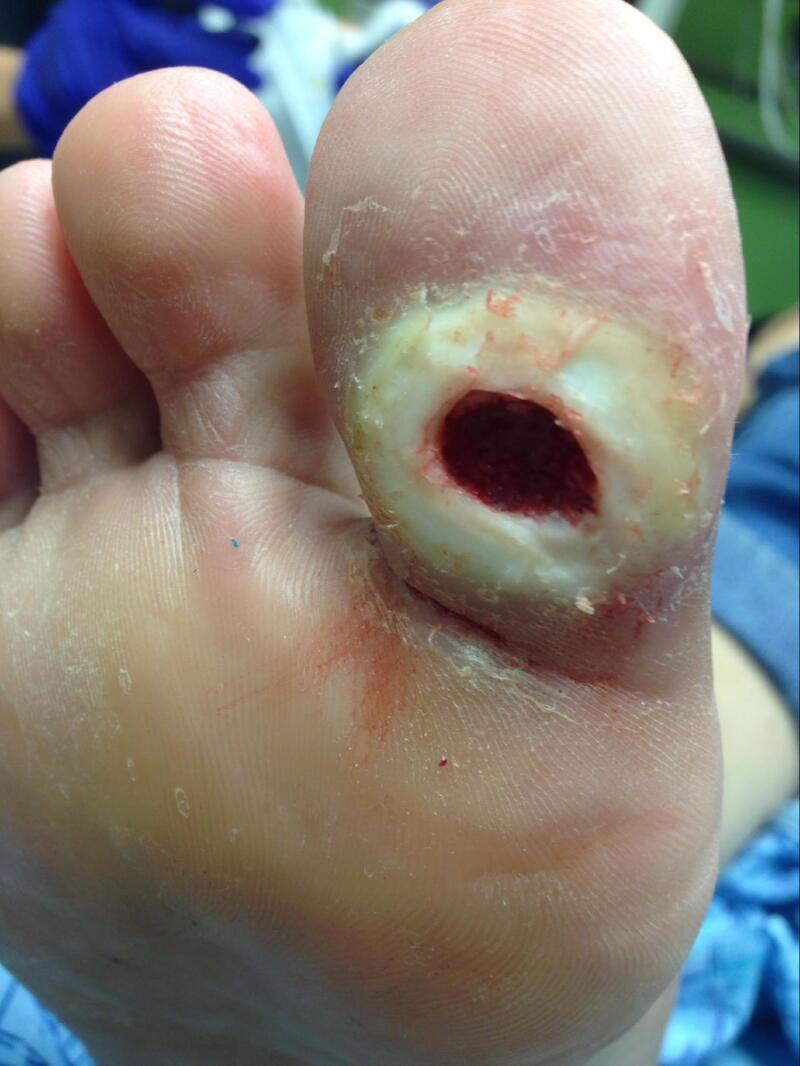
Example of a diabetic foot ulcer, which can lead to infections such as OM.

Symptoms of osteomyelitis are often nonspecific and may include redness, swelling and pain surrounding the affected area. Patients may also experience bone pain and other nonspecific symptoms such as fatigue and night sweats. In acute osteomyelitis, symptom onset may occur more rapidly, such as over a few days and may commonly include fever. In chronic osteomyelitis, systemic symptoms, such as fever, are less commonly seen. Chronic osteomyelitis may also be seen with chronic nonhealing ulcers or fractures. In diabetic patients with neuropathy or vascular insufficiency, skin ulcers may be present and can lead to OM. Inability to bear weight may be seen in acute hematogenous osteomyelitis in children.

The most commonly affected areas for children are the long bones and for adults are the feet, spine, and hips.

=== Complications ===
Factors that may commonly complicate osteomyelitis are fractures of the bone, amyloidosis, endocarditis, or sepsis.

== Cause ==
Group	Common organisms
Infants (<3 months)	Staphylococcus aureus, group B Streptococcus (S. agalactiae), E. coli
Infants (>3 months)	S. aureus,Streptococcus pneumoniae, Streptococcus pyogenes, Kingella kingae
Children (1 year - 16 years)	S. aureus, H. influenzae, Streptococcus pyogenes
Adults	S. aureus, coagulase negative Staphylococcus species, β-hemolytic streptococci, Viridans streptococci, Enterococci, Pseudomonas, Enterobacter, E. coli
Sickle cell anemia patients	Salmonella species are most common in patients with sickle cell disease.
Injection drug users	S. aureus, Pseudomonas, Eikenella corrodenes, Candida
Hemodialysis patients	S. aureus, coagulase-negative staphylococci, enterococci, aerobic gram negative bacilli, Candida
Patients with joint prosthetics	S. epidermidis
Patients with puncture wound on foot	Pseudomonas
Diabetic foot infection	S. aureus, anaerobes, often polymicrobial

Staphylococcus aureus is the organism most commonly isolated from all forms of osteomyelitis.

Tubercular osteomyelitis is a secondary complication in 1–3% of patients with pulmonary tuberculosis. In this case, the bacteria generally spread to the bone through the circulatory system, first infecting the synovium (due to its higher oxygen concentration) before spreading to adjacent bone. In tubercular osteomyelitis the long bones and vertebrae tend to be affected. In adults, vertebral osteomyelitis is commonly caused by S. aureus, but may be caused by Mycobacterium tuberculosis (Pott's disease).

Mycotic infections, such as Coccidioides immitis and Histoplasma capsulatum may also cause OM in patients living in endemic areas.

The Burkholderia cepacia complex has been implicated in vertebral osteomyelitis in intravenous drug users.

=== Risk factors ===
- Diabetic neuropathy
- Smoking (in patients with diabetes and healing fractures)
- History of multiple foot ulcers, larger foot ulcers and inflammation near ulcer
- Surgical operation duration over 3 hours
- Surgical incision over 10 cm
- Polymicrobial infections
- Trauma resulting in open fractures or open repair of closed fractures
- Injection drug use
- Hemodialysis

== Pathogenesis ==
In general, microorganisms may infect bone through one or more of the following mechanisms:

- Via the bloodstream (hematogenous) to a distant site – the most common method
  - In children, commonly results in OM of long bones
  - In adults, commonly results in OM of vertebrae
- From nearby areas of soft tissue infection by contiguous spread, penetrating trauma, surgery or prosthetic materials
- Vascular insufficiency OM, as seen in diabetic foot infection

In hematogenous OM, the metaphysis is the most commonly affected area of bone due to slowing of blood in the vascular loops of the region. Because of the particulars of their blood supply, the tibia, femur, humerus, vertebrae, maxilla and the mandibular bodies are especially susceptible to osteomyelitis.

The proliferation of bacteria leads to an inflammatory reaction in the acute phase which progresses to death of bone cells and marrow in the first 48 hours. Bacteria continue to spread to the periosteum and in children a subperiosteal abscess may form due to the loose attachment of the periosteum. If the periosteum ruptures, a soft tissue abscess may form. The infection may also spread into a nearby joint leading to septic or suppurative arthritis.

After the first week, areas of devitalized infected bone, known as sequestra, are present due to release of cytokines from the chronic inflammatory cells. Often, the body will try to create new bone around the area of necrosis, resulting in new bone called an involucrum.

Chronic osteomyelitis may be due to the presence of intracellular bacteria. Once intracellular, the bacteria are able to spread to adjacent bone cells. At this point, the bacteria may be resistant to certain antibiotics. In chronic osteomyelitis, Staphylococcus aureus can persist by forming biofilms and invading the osteocyte lacuno‑canalicular network, which contributes to antibiotic tolerance and difficulty eradicating infection.

== Diagnosis ==
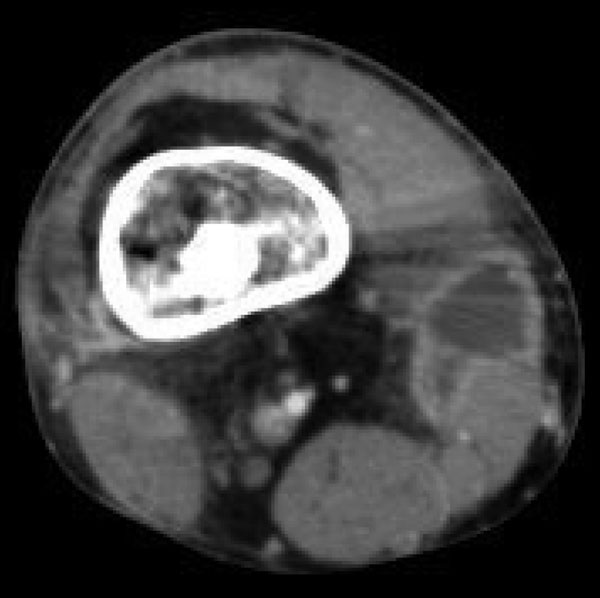
Mycobacterium doricum osteomyelitis and soft tissue infection. Computed tomography scan of the right lower extremity of a 21-year-old patient, showing abscess formation adjacent to nonunion of a right femur fracture.

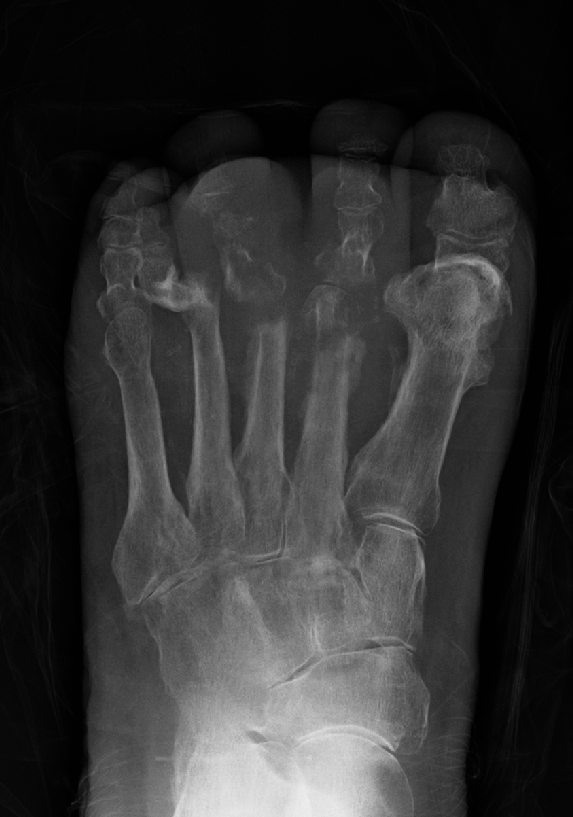
Extensive osteomyelitis of the forefoot

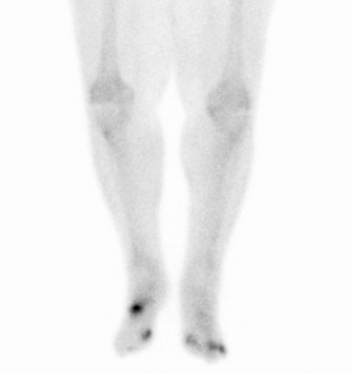
Osteomyelitis in both feet as seen on bone scan

Diagnosis of OM is complex and relies on clinical findings as well as labs and imaging. Laboratory studies in osteomyelitis may show elevated inflammatory markers (C-reactive protein and erythrocyte sedimentation rate), leukocytosis (elevated WBCs), thrombocytosis (elevated platelets) and positive blood cultures. First line imaging will include plan film radiography, though advanced imaging with MRI is often completed due to the high sensitivity and negative predictive value.

Diagnosis of osteomyelitis is often based on radiologic results showing a lytic center with a ring of sclerosis. Radiographs are the first line imaging choice in OM work-up, however, further imaging is typically needed as early changes will not be seen on plain films. Radiographs or CT can show the cortical destruction of advanced osteomyelitis, but can miss nascent or indolent diagnoses.

MRI is often indicated following plain films and contrast may be utilized to evaluate for other concerns, though is not necessary for the diagnosis of OM. In certain situations, such as severe Charcot arthropathy, diagnosis with MRI is still difficult. Similarly, it is limited in distinguishing avascular necrosis from osteomyelitis in sickle cell anemia.

Confirmation is most often by MRI, though PET scans can also be used to diagnose OM. PET scans may be utilized in patients with contraindications to MRI, though notably there is a risk for false positives in patients with recent trauma, healed OM and arthritis among other conditions.

Positive culture from a biopsy of the affected site is needed for definitive diagnosis. Culture of material taken from a bone biopsy is needed to identify the specific pathogen; alternative sampling methods such as needle puncture or surface swabs are easier to perform, but cannot be trusted to produce reliable results. A probe to bone test is indicative of OM in patient's with OM of the lower extremity secondary to vascular insufficiency.

=== Classification ===
OM may be classified in several ways. Acute OM develops within days to weeks while chronic OM develops over months to years. OM may also be classified based on pathogenesis (hematogenous spread, contiguous spread, or OM due to vascular insufficiency). The Cierny-Mader staging system is another way OM may be classified and includes anatomic and physiologic types in classification:

- Anatomic stage
  - 1 - Medullary
  - 2 - Superficial
  - 3 - Localized
  - 4 - Diffuse
- Physiologic host
  - A host - Normal
  - B host - Systemic compromise, Local compromise or Systemic and local compromise
  - C host - Treatment worse than disease

Several classification systems exist for OM related to the jawbones and may include the following differentiations:

- Suppurative osteomyelitis
  - Acute suppurative osteomyelitis
  - Chronic suppurative osteomyelitis
    - Primary (no preceding phase)
    - Secondary (follows an acute phase)
- Non-suppurative osteomyelitis
  - Diffuse sclerosing
  - Focal sclerosing (condensing osteitis)
  - Proliferative periostitis (periostitis ossificans, Garré's sclerosing osteomyelitis)
  - Osteoradionecrosis

== Treatment ==
Treatment of OM can include antibiotics and surgical interventions. The Cierny-Mader staging system can help determine which treatment will be pursued. The Infectious Diseases Society of America provides guidelines for diagnosis and treatment of diabetic foot infections, native vertebral osteomyelitis, and pediatric acute hematogenous OM (in conjunction with the Pediatric Infectious Diseases Society).

Antibiotic regimen is tailored to the specific organism(s) in the positive culture, though hospitalized patients may receive empiric antibiotic coverage. The most common empiric regimen includes vancomycin with a third generation cephalosporin or beta lactam/beta-lactamase inhibitor in order to provide broad spectrum coverage. In adult patients, parenteral antibiotics followed by continuation with oral antibiotics has been shown to be as effective as continuation with long-term parenteral antibiotics. Local and sustained availability of drugs have proven to be more effective in achieving prophylactic and therapeutic outcomes. Antibiotic regimens of 4-6 weeks are recommended and for patients continuing with parenteral antibiotics post-discharge, a PICC line may be utilized. Some studies of children with acute osteomyelitis report that antibiotic by mouth may be justified due to PICC-related complications.

Surgical debridement with drainage of associated soft tissue abscesses may be required. Open surgery for chronic osteomyelitis, whereby the involucrum is opened and the sequestrum is removed or sometimes saucerization can be done.

Hyperbaric oxygen therapy has been shown to be a useful adjunct to the treatment of refractory osteomyelitis.

There is tentative evidence that bioactive glass may also be useful in long bone infections. Support from randomized controlled trials, however, was not available as of 2015.

Due to insufficient evidence it is unclear what the best antibiotic treatment is for osteomyelitis in people with sickle cell disease as of 2019.

Hemicorporectomy is performed in severe cases of Terminal Osteomyelitis in the Pelvis if further treatment won't stop the infection.

== Prevention or screening ==
There are no specific vaccinations which prevent OM. Most often, prophylactic antibiotics are not utilized.

In patients with diabetes, quality foot care may prevent development of OM.

== Epidemiology ==
About 2.4 per 100,000 people are affected by osteomyelitis each year. The young and old are more commonly affected. Males are more commonly affected than females.

== History ==
The word is from Greek words ὀστέον osteon, meaning bone, μυελός myelos meaning marrow, and -ῖτις -itis meaning inflammation.

In 1875, American artist Thomas Eakins depicted a surgical procedure for osteomyelitis at Jefferson Medical College, in an oil painting titled The Gross Clinic.

Canadian politician and premier of Saskatchewan Tommy Douglas suffered from osteomyelitis as a child, and in 1910, underwent several surgeries, which the surgeon performed for free in exchange for allowing his medical students to observe the procedures (which Douglas's parents could not have otherwise afforded). This experience convinced him that medical care should be free for everyone. Douglas became known as the Canadian "Father of Medicare".

Before the widespread availability and use of antibiotics, blow fly larvae were sometimes deliberately introduced to the wounds to feed on the infected material, effectively scouring them clean.

Ancient DNA analysis of pre-antibiotic-era (19th–20th century) human bone specimens from Germany recovered Staphylococcus aureus, Streptococcus pyogenes, and Acinetobacter baumannii genomes, showing that many virulence genes and antimicrobial-resistance genes seen in modern strains were already present before antibiotics came into use, with some strains belonging to lineages responsible for outbreaks worldwide today.

=== Fossil record ===
Evidence for osteomyelitis found in the fossil record is studied by paleopathologists, specialists in ancient disease and injury. It has been reported in fossils of the large carnivorous dinosaur Allosaurus fragilis. Osteomyelitis has been also associated with the first evidence of parasites in dinosaur bones.

== See also ==
- Brodie abscess
- Chronic recurrent multifocal osteomyelitis
- SAPHO syndrome
- Garre's sclerosing osteomyelitis
