= Franz Volhard =

German nephrologist (1872–1950)

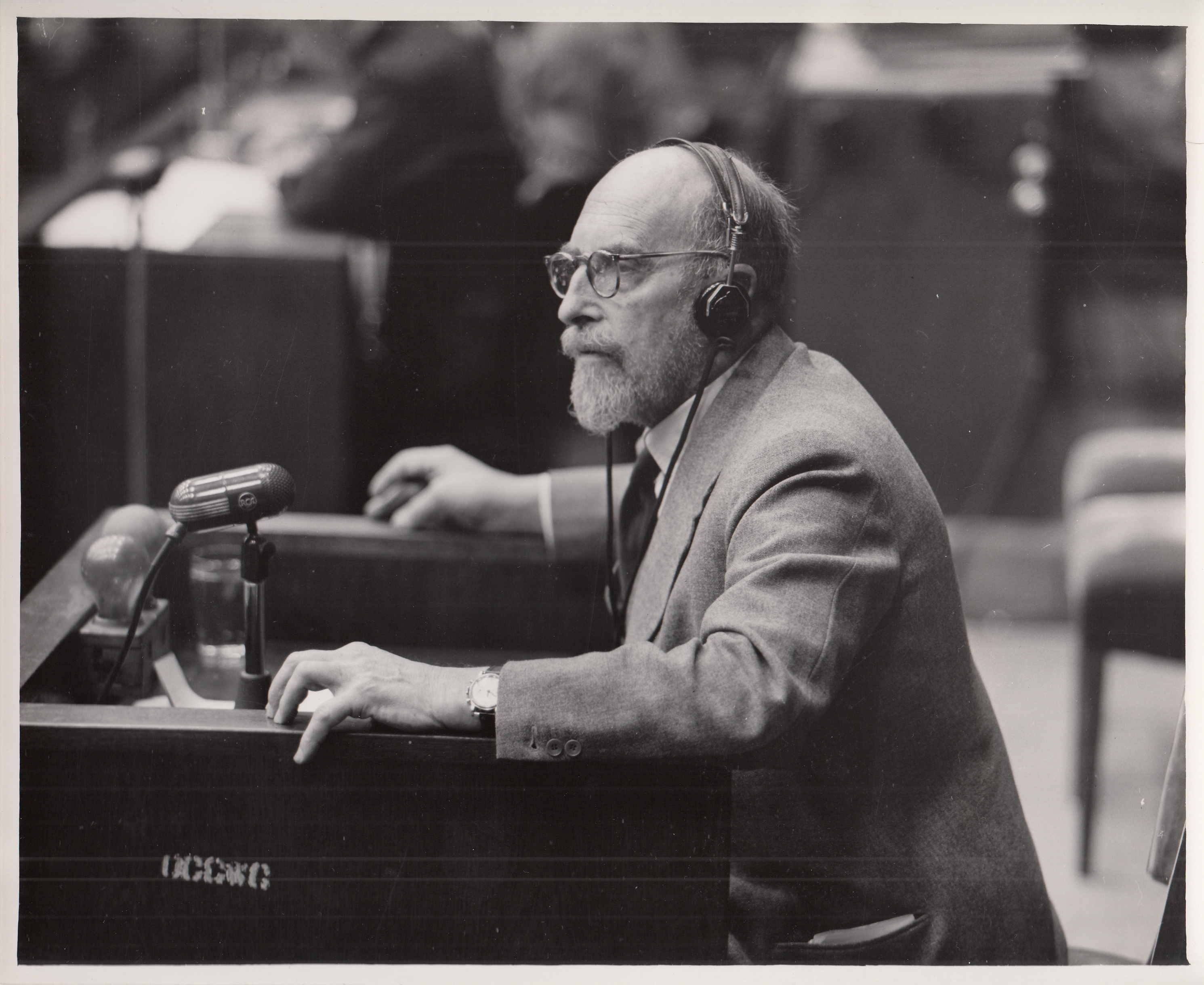
Franz Volhard as a witness in the Nuremberg Doctors' Trial, 1947

Franz Volhard (2 May 1872 – 24 May 1950) was a German internist born in Munich.

== Academic career ==
He studied medicine at the universities of Bonn, Strasbourg, and Halle. As a student his instructors included Eduard Friedrich Wilhelm Pflüger (1829–1910), Bernhard Naunyn (1839–1925), Oswald Schmiedeberg (1838–1921), and Joseph von Mering (1849–1908). From 1897 to 1905 he worked at the university medical clinic at Giessen under Franz Riegel (1843–1904). In 1905 he became head of the medical department at the city hospital in Dortmund, and in 1908 was named director of the Krankenanstalt in Mannheim, now University Hospital Mannheim. Afterwards, he served as a professor at the universities of Halle (from 1918) and Frankfurt (from 1927).

== Medical research ==
Volhard made several important contributions in the fields of cardiology and nephrology. He is especially remembered for his collaborative work with pathologist Karl Theodor Fahr (1877–1945) in Mannheim, where the two men carried out research of kidney diseases. The two physicians created a classification system of renal disorders, making the differentiation between degenerative (nephroses), inflammatory (nephritides) and arteriosclerotic (scleroses) diseases. With Fahr, he published a classic monograph on Bright's disease called Die Bright'sche Nierenkrankheit, Klinik, Pathologie und Atlas.

Volhard recognized that constrictive pericarditis was a treatable condition, and as a result of his research with Viktor Schmieden (1874–1945), it led to the first pericardectomy for constrictive pericarditis. Volhard also performed extensive studies involving renovascular hypertension and uremia. Regarding uremia, he divided associated symptoms into two criteria called "true uremia" and "pseudo-uremia". Pseudo-uremia was described as having symptoms of independent origin, such as cases involving elevated arterial blood pressure.

In 1903, Volhard was credited with the discovery of lipase in the heart and kidney. He also developed a method of preserving cardiac specimens via a process of dehydration and the application of hot paraffin. In 1917, he joined the German Fatherland Party. In Berlin the "Franz-Volhard-Klinik" is named in his honor.

== Family ==
Volhard was the grandfather of the Nobel laureate Christiane Nüsslein-Volhard and the great-grandfather of the Nobel laureate Benjamin List.
