= Victoria, Johannesburg =

Victoria
- Location within Gauteng Location within South Africa
- Coordinates: 26.164°S 28.075°E
- Country: South Africa
- Province: Gauteng
- Municipality: City of Johannesburg
- Main Place: Johannesburg
- Established: 1902

Area
  - Total: 0.18 km^{2} (0.069 sq mi)

Population (2011)
  - Total: 1,288
  - Density: 7,200/km^{2} (19,000/sq mi)

Racial makeup (2011)
  - Black African: 73.9%
  - Coloured: 3.5%
  - Indian/Asian: 9.8%
  - White: 12.8%

First languages (2011)
  - English: 29.3%
  - Northern Sotho: 25.0%
  - Zulu: 9.2%
  - Tswana: 7.5%
  - Other: 28.9%
- Time zone: UTC+2 (SAST)
- Postal code (street): 2192

Victoria is a suburb of Johannesburg, South Africa. It is located in Region E of the City of Johannesburg Metropolitan Municipality. It is a small suburb located north-east of the city centre surrounded by Norwood to its north, the Houghton Estate to its west and south, while Orange Grove lies to the east.

== History ==
Victoria lies on land that once made up the farm called Klipfontein, one of many large farms that make what is Johannesburg and its suburbs. The suburb was proclaimed in December 1902. The land was owned by B.P. Viljoen and appears to be named after Queen Victoria who had died the year before.
