= Viktor Schmieden =

German surgeon (1874–1945)

Viktor Schmieden (19 January 1874 – 11 October 1945) was a German surgeon born in Berlin.

In 1897 he earned his medical doctorate from the University of Bonn, and subsequently worked in hospitals in Göttingen, Berlin and Bonn. Later he was a professor at the Universities of Halle (from 1913) and Frankfurt (from 1919).

Schmieden is remembered for his work with Franz Volhard (1872-1950) in the establishment of pericardectomy for the treatment of constrictive pericarditis. Historically this procedure was referred to as "Schmieden's operation". He also made important contributions towards the treatment of hydrocephalus, and in 1926 identified that polyps of the colon were a precursor of colorectal cancer. He was a Generalarzt in the Wehrmacht during World War II.

== Written works ==
Schmieden was the author of numerous works. With August Borchard (1864-1940), he was co-author of two books on war-related surgery; Lehrbuch der Kriegschirurgie and Die deutsche Chirurgie im Weltkriege 1914-1918), and with Ernst Ferdinand Sauerbruch (1875-1951), he published the sixth edition of Chirurgische Operationslehre (Surgical Operation Teachings) by August Karl Gustav Bier, Heinrich Braun and Hermann Kümmell. Other noted worked by Schmieden include:

- Der chirurgische Operationskursus, (1910); 12th edition with A. W. Fischer in 1930; translated into English.
- Ueber Erkennung und Behandlung der Umklammerung des Herzens durch schwielige Parikarditis, with Franz Volhard (1872-1950). Klinische Wochenschrift, Berlin, 1923, 2: 5–9. First complete pericardectomy for constrictive pericarditis.
- Die theoretischen Grundlagen der Hyperaemiebehandlung; In: Handbuch der normalen und pathologischen Physiologie, volume 7, 2; Berlin, (1927)
- Die Geschichte der Laparotomie; Berlin, (1936)
