= Maryvale, Gauteng =

Maryvale
- Location within Gauteng Location within South Africa
- Coordinates: 26.153°S 28.087°E
- Country: South Africa
- Province: Gauteng
- Municipality: City of Johannesburg
- Main Place: Johannesburg

Area
  - Total: 0.06 km^{2} (0.023 sq mi)

Population (2011)
  - Total: 85
  - Density: 1,400/km^{2} (3,700/sq mi)

Racial makeup (2011)
  - Black African: 62.8%
  - Coloured: 8.1%
  - White: 29.1%

First languages (2011)
  - English: 42.9%
  - Northern Sotho: 15.5%
  - Zulu: 11.9%
  - Southern Ndebele: 8.3%
  - Other: 21.4%
- Time zone: UTC+2 (SAST)
- Postal code (street): 2192

Maryvale is a suburb of Johannesburg, South Africa. It is located in Region E of the City of Johannesburg Metropolitan Municipality. It is a tiny triangular suburb surrounded by the suburbs of Orchards and Sydenham.

== History ==
The suburb was founded in 1939 and borders Louis Botha Avenue. It was surveyed around 1912 and developed from 1921 on land originally on the farm Klipfontein. The suburb's land was owned by Ockert Jacobus van Wyk and was named after his wife Mary. The suburb consists mainly of businesses and a small number of houses. The suburb is also the home of Maryvale College, a Catholic primary and high school formed in the same year as the suburb though the red bricked church on the grounds was built a year earlier.
