= Karl Theodor Fahr =

German pathologist

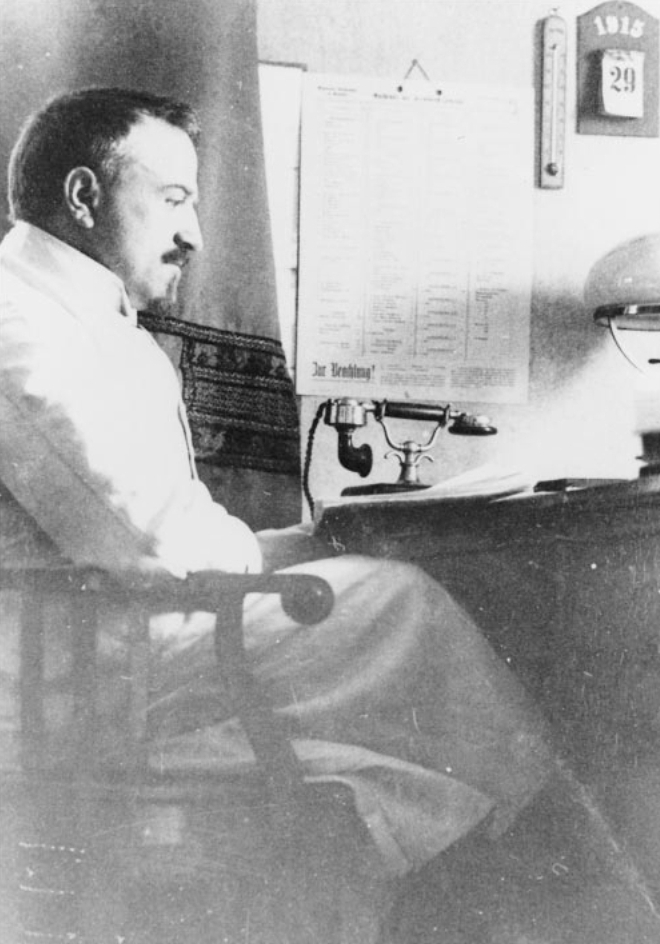
Karl Theodor Fahr (1877-1945)

Karl Theodor Fahr (German pronunciation: [kaʁl ˈteːodoːɐ̯ ˈfaːɐ̯]; 3 October 1877 – 29 October 1945) was a German pathologist born in Pirmasens of the Rhineland-Palatinate.

In 1903 he earned his medical doctorate from the University of Giessen, afterwards continuing his studies with Eugen Bostroem (1850-1926) in Giessen, under Morris Simmonds (1855-1925) in Hamburg and with Ilya Ilyich Metchnikoff (1845-1916) in Paris. In 1924, he became director of the pathological institute at the University Medical Center Hamburg-Eppendorf.

Fahr is remembered for his work in nephrology and research of kidney disorders. With internist Franz Volhard (1872-1950) he published a comprehensive monograph on Bright's disease titled Die Brightsche Nierenkrankheit. In 1923, he provided an early correlation between lung cancer (Bronchialkarzinom) and tobacco smoking. Today his name is associated with Fahr's disease, which is a degenerative neurological disorder characterized by calcifications and cell loss within the basal ganglia. Fahr was however not the first describe the disease and there are suggestions that the eponym be avoided.

In 1933 Fahr signed the Vow of allegiance of the Professors of the German Universities and High-Schools to Adolf Hitler and the National Socialistic State. He committed suicide in 1945.

== Selected writings ==
- Die Bright'sche Nierenkrankheit: Klinik, Pathologie und Atlas. (Bright's kidney disease: clinic, pathology and atlas); with Franz Volhard, Springer, Berlin 1914.
- Die Nierengewächse. In: Friedrich Henke und Otto Lubarsch (Hrsg.): Handbuch der speziellen pathologischen Anatomie und Histologie. Band 6, 1. Berlin 1925.
- Zusammenhangstrennung und durch Gewaltanwendung bedingte krankhafte Veränderungen des Nierenbeckens und des Harnleiters. In: Friedrich Henke und Otto Lubarsch (Hrsg.): Handbuch der speziellen pathologischen Antomie und Histologie. Band 6, 1. Berlin 1925. - Connection and disconnection caused by morbid changes of the renal pelvis and ureter.
