= August Borchard =

German physician and surgeon (1864–1940)

- Born: 4 July 1864; Lemgo, North Rhine-Westphalia, Germany
- Died: 19 February 1940 (aged 75); Berlin, Germany
- Education: University of Freiburg; Ludwig-Maximilians-Universität München; University of Würzburg; University of Jena
- Occupations: Physician; surgeon

August Borchard (4 July 1864, Lemgo – 19 February 1940, Berlin) was a German physician and surgeon.

He studied medicine at the University of Freiburg, the Ludwig-Maximilians-Universität München, the University of Würzburg, and the University of Jena, receiving his doctorate at the latter institution in 1888 with a thesis on carcinomas of the antrum of Highmore, Ueber Carcinome der Highmorshöhle. Afterwards, he worked as an assistant in the pathological institute at Marburg University and as a physician in the surgical clinic at the University of Königsberg. In 1895, he was a senior physician in the surgical department at the Diakonissenhaus in Posen. He later moved to the Friedrich Wilhelm University of Berlin, where he attained a professorship in 1908.

In 1930, he became a member of the Academy of Sciences Leopoldina. In 1934/35, he served as president of the Deutschen Gesellschaft für Unfallchirurgie (German Association for Trauma Surgery). He was co-publisher and editor of the Archivs für klinische Chirurgie and the Zentralblatts für Chirurgie.

== Selected works ==
- Über Lungenschüsse, 1917.
- Lehrbuch der Kriegs-chirurgie, (with Viktor Schmieden), 1917 – Textbook of war surgery.
- Die deutsche Chirurgie im Weltkrieg 1914 bis 1918, (with Viktor Schmieden), 1920 – German surgery during the War Years 1914–1918.
- Lehrbuch der Chirurgie (with Carl Garré), 1920 – Textbook of surgery.
