= Raedene Estate =

- Location within Gauteng Location within South Africa
- Coordinates: 26.148°S 28.092°E
- Country: South Africa
- Province: Gauteng
- Municipality: City of Johannesburg
- Main Place: Johannesburg
- Established: 1935

Area
  - Total: 0.10 km^{2} (0.039 sq mi)

Population (2011)
  - Total: 242
  - Density: 2,400/km^{2} (6,300/sq mi)

Racial makeup (2011)
  - Black African: 29.3%
  - White: 70.7%

First languages (2011)
  - English: 72.6%
  - Zulu: 9.1%
  - Northern Sotho: 3.7%
  - Sotho: 2.9%
  - Other: 11.6%
- Time zone: UTC+2 (SAST)

Raedene Estate is a suburb of Johannesburg, South Africa. It is found just north of Sydenham. It is located in Region E of the City of Johannesburg Metropolitan Municipality.

== History ==
The suburb is situated on part of an old Witwatersrand farm called Klipfontein. Named after the land owner Rae Sandler and dene meaning a valley, it became a suburb on 13 February 1935.
