= Wynberg, Gauteng =

Wynberg
- Location within Gauteng Location within South Africa
- Coordinates: 26.110°S 28.084°E
- Country: South Africa
- Province: Gauteng
- Municipality: City of Johannesburg
- Main Place: Sandton

Area
  - Total: 2.12 km^{2} (0.82 sq mi)

Population (2011)
  - Total: 2,701
  - Density: 1,270/km^{2} (3,300/sq mi)

Racial makeup (2011)
  - Black African: 98.7%
  - Coloured: 0.4%
  - Indian/Asian: 0.1%
  - White: 0.3%
  - Other: 0.4%

First languages (2011)
  - Zulu: 26.1%
  - Northern Sotho: 22.1%
  - Tsonga: 13.5%
  - Xhosa: 11.4%
  - Other: 26.8%
- Time zone: UTC+2 (SAST)
- Postal code (street): 2090
- PO box: 7824
- Area code: 011

Wynberg (/ˈwaɪnbɜːrɡ/ WYNE-burg) is a suburb of Johannesburg, South Africa. It is located in Region E of the City of Johannesburg Metropolitan Municipality. It has been called Johannesburg's worst named suburb, as it is not a leafy, vine covered enclave with a mountain view, but rather a built-up area with wall-to-wall factories.

TV Portuguesa was headquartered here.
