= Fairwood, Gauteng =

Fairwood
- Location within Gauteng Location within South Africa
- Coordinates: 26.164°S 28.086°E
- Country: South Africa
- Province: Gauteng
- Municipality: City of Johannesburg
- Main Place: Johannesburg
- Established: 1905

Area
  - Total: 0.10 km^{2} (0.039 sq mi)

Population (2011)
  - Total: 349
  - Density: 3,500/km^{2} (9,000/sq mi)

Racial makeup (2011)
  - Black African: 37.0%
  - Indian/Asian: 4.0%
  - White: 59.0%

First languages (2011)
  - English: 63.7%
  - Zulu: 11.1%
  - Northern Sotho: 6.0%
  - Sotho: 5.1%
  - Other: 14.0%
- Time zone: UTC+2 (SAST)
- Postal code (street): 2192

Fairwood is a suburb of Johannesburg, South Africa. It is a small elevated suburb on the edge of Linksfield Ridge tucked between the suburbs of Orange Grove, Linksfield and Mountain View. Sylvia Pass winds down through the suburb. It is located in Region E of the City of Johannesburg Metropolitan Municipality.

== History ==
It became a suburb in 1905, developed by Richard Currie and George Henry Goch and the suburb name originates from the thickets that grew on the ridge.
