= August Socin =

Swiss surgeon and educator (1837–1899)

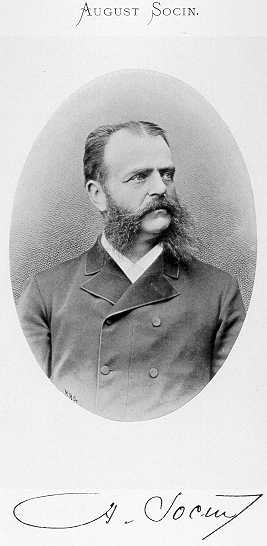
August Socin

August Socin (February 21, 1837 – January 22, 1899) was a Swiss surgeon and educator born in the town of Vevey.

== Biography ==
In 1857 he received his medical doctorate at the University of Würzburg, and subsequently became a hospital surgeon and professor of surgery in Basel (full professor from 1864). Socin also gained valuable surgical experience working in military hospitals at Verona and Karlsruhe.

Socin is credited with the development of surgical innovations, and was a specialist involving gastrointestinal and "radical hernia" operations. He was one of the first physicians in Europe to advocate the use of Joseph Lister’s antiseptic practices.

Socin placed great importance on the education of medical students, and advocated several reforms regarding the qualitative improvement of student training. In Basel, he founded an institute that handled the prosthetic needs of disabled war veterans.

== Selected writings ==
- Erkrankungen der Prostata. (Diseases of the prostate), in: Franz von Pitha and Theodor Billroth's "Handbuch der allgemeinen und speciellen Chirurgie". Stuttgart 1871.
- Kriegschirurgische Erfahrungen. (Surgical war experiences), Karlsruhe 1872.
