= Cheltondale =

- Location within Gauteng Location within South Africa
- Coordinates: 26°09′05″S 28°05′01″E
- Country: South Africa
- Province: Gauteng
- Municipality: City of Johannesburg
- Main Place: Johannesburg
- Established: 1951

Area
  - Total: 0.21 km^{2} (0.081 sq mi)

Population (2011)
  - Total: 888
  - Density: 4,200/km^{2} (11,000/sq mi)

Racial makeup (2011)
  - Black African: 19.6%
  - Coloured: 0.8%
  - Indian/Asian: 3.3%
  - White: 74.6%
  - Other: 1.8%

First languages (2011)
  - English: 80.0%
  - Afrikaans: 6.4%
  - Zulu: 3.5%
  - Southern Ndebele: 2.8%
  - Other: 7.3%
- Time zone: UTC+2 (SAST)
- Postal code (street): 2192

Cheltondale is a suburb of Johannesburg, South Africa. It is located in Region E of the City of Johannesburg Metropolitan Municipality.

== History ==
The suburb is situated on part of an old Witwatersrand farm called Klipfontein. It was established in 1951 and was named after the developer, H. Dare's hometown Cheltondale, Gloucestershire.
