= Orchards, Johannesburg =

Orchards
- Location within Gauteng Location within South Africa
- Coordinates: 26.152°S 28.075°E
- Country: South Africa
- Province: Gauteng
- Municipality: City of Johannesburg
- Main Place: Johannesburg
- Established: 1902

Area
  - Total: 0.81 km^{2} (0.31 sq mi)

Population (2011)
  - Total: 2,282
  - Density: 2,800/km^{2} (7,300/sq mi)

Racial makeup (2011)
  - Black African: 37.7%
  - Coloured: 1.1%
  - Indian/Asian: 4.5%
  - White: 54.7%
  - Other: 1.9

First languages (2011)
  - English: 63.8%
  - Northern Sotho: 2.9%
  - Zulu: 9.0%
  - Southern Ndebele: 2.0%
  - Other: 22.3%
- Time zone: UTC+2 (SAST)
- Postal code (street): 2192

Orchards is a suburb of Johannesburg, South Africa. It is located in Region E of the City of Johannesburg Metropolitan Municipality. It is a small suburb surrounded by the wealthy suburb of Oaklands as well as Norwood, Sydenham and The Gardens.

== History ==
Orchards was declared as a suburb in March 1902. The land at the time was said to be covered in around 2,500 fruit and ornamental tree with an existing homestead. The orchards of the suburb were watered by the Orange Grove Spruit, a seasonal stream with its source on the ridge above Louis Botha Avenue close to Fellside. Most of the stream through the suburb is now either underground or canalized with it eventually forming up with the Sandspruit river. The lands owner, prior to being surveyed as a township, was William Anderson Martin, and was purchased in 1896, consisting of 18 acres of what is now known as Oaklands and Orchards. The land for the St Luke's Anglican Church was donated by him.

== Heritage ==
Orchards has several heritage sites. The Kraal is a house in Pine Street, now a museum and guest house, built in 1907 by Hermann Kallenbach and has two rondavels attached to it. It was inhabited by Kallenbach's friend Mohandas Gandhi who lived there between 1908-1909.

Other heritage buildings include the Pine Street Shul built in 1959 with stone friezes that depict the 12 Israeli tribes and designed by Eduardo Villa. An older synagogue, no longer in use, is also in Pine Street and was built in 1946.

On the corner of Pine and Garden Road is New Covenant Baptist Church (originally St Giles Presbyterian Church) which dates from 1956 and extended again in 1965. St Luke's, an Anglican church, stands in High Street and was built in 1907 and designed by Sir Herbert Baker, was extended in 1920s, a hall built in 1951 and in 1956 further building of a tower, gallery and vestries took place.

Orchards Primary School/Laerskool Dirkie Uys was established in 1928 as the Norwood Afrikaans Medium School and then a year later as the Orchards Afrikaans Skool and then named the Laerskool Dirkie Uys in 1933.

The Spark Gallery sits in Louis Road and was built in 1938 for the City of Johannesburg with its original function as an electrical substation which was closed down in the 1960s.

In Orchards, some of the plane trees in Oaklands and Garden Roads date back to 1930's.

== Religious sites ==
- NGKerk Andrew Murray
- Chassidim Shul
- Pine Street Shul
- St Luke's Anglican Church
- New Covenant Baptist Church (formerly St Giles Presbyterian Church)

== Schools ==
- Torah Academy
- Orchards Primary School/Laerskool Dirkie Uys
