= SS Fairwood =

1943 German cargo ship

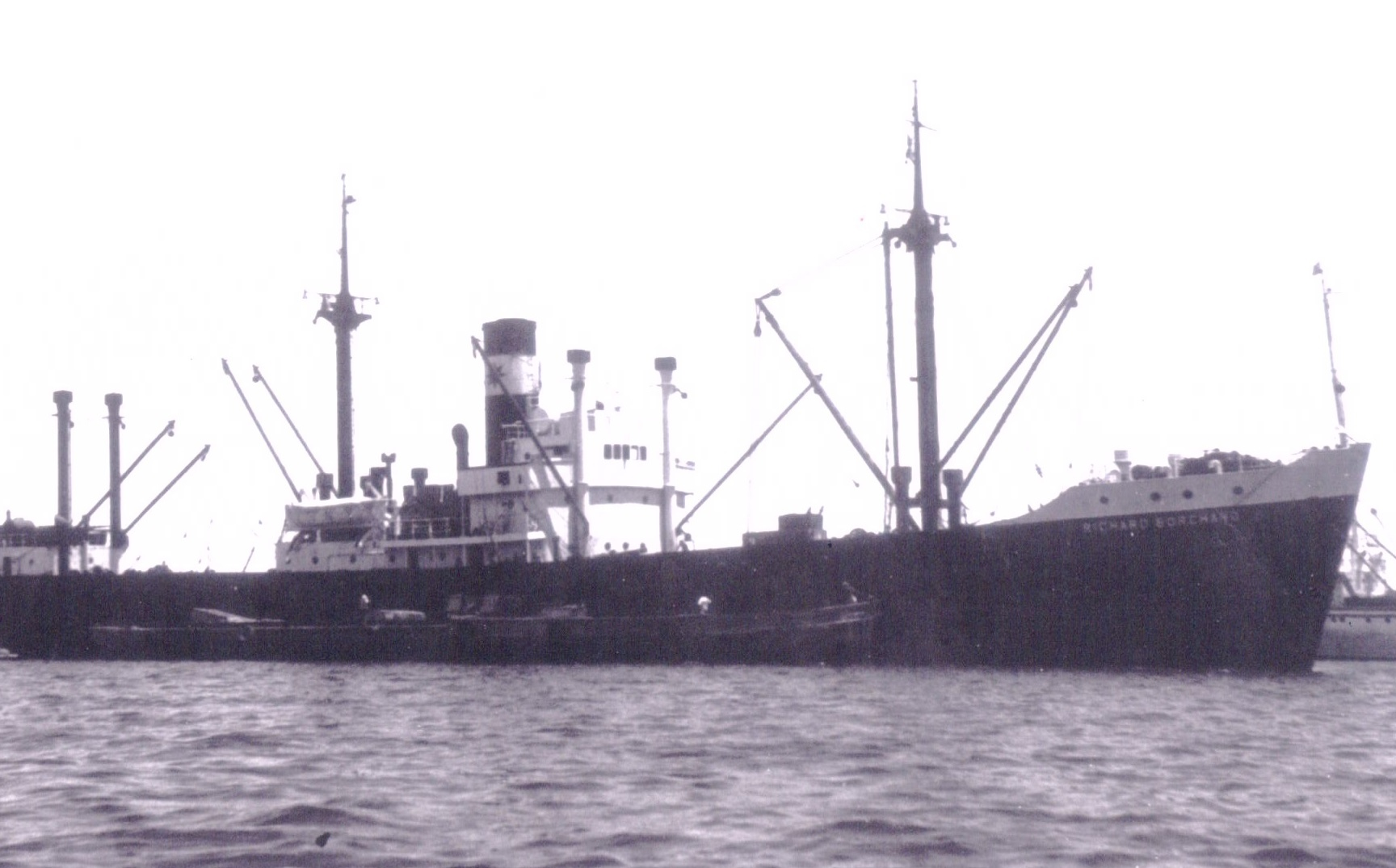
- Richard Borchard

History
- Name: Celia (1943-45); Empire Gallant (1945-47); Richard Borchard (1947-60); Fairwood (1960-63)
- Owner: A Kirsten (1944-45); Ministry of War Transport (1945-46); Borchard (UK) Ltd (1947-60); Fairplay Schleppdampfschiffahrt Reederei (1960-63)
- Operator: A Kirsten (1944-45); London & Edinburgh Shipping Co. (1945-46); Borchard (UK) Ltd (1947-60); Richard Borchard GmbH (1960-63)
- Port of registry: (Nazi Germany) Hamburg, Germany (1943-45); London, United Kingdom (1945-60); Hamburg, West Germany (1960-63)
- Builder: Lübecker Maschinenbau-Gesellschaft
- Yard number: 402
- Launched: 1943
- Completed: January 1944
- Out of service: 1963
- Identification: United Kingdom Official Number 180613 (1945-60); Code Letters GJGX (1945-60); IMO number: 5111854 ( –1963)
- Fate: Scrapped

General characteristics
- Class & type: Hansa A type Cargo ship
- Tonnage: 1,923 GRT, 935 NRT, 3,400 DWT
- Length: 85.22 m (279 ft 7 in)
- Beam: 13.51 m (44 ft 4 in)
- Depth: 4.80 m (15 ft 9 in)
- Installed power: Compound steam engine, 1,200IHP
- Propulsion: Single screw propeller
- Speed: 10.5 knots (19.4 km/h)

Fairwood was a Hansa A Type cargo ship which was built as Celia in 1943 by Lübecker Maschinenbau-Gesellschaft, Lübeck, Germany for A. Kirsten, Hamburg, Germany. She was seized as a prize of war in 1945, passing to the Ministry of War Transport and renamed Empire Gallant. She was sold in 1947 and was renamed Richard Borchard. She was sold in 1960 to West Germany and was renamed Fairwood. She served until 1963 when she was scrapped.

== Description ==
The ship was 85.22 m (279 ft 7 in) long, with a beam of 13.51 m (44 ft 4 in). She had a depth of 4.80 m (15 ft 9 in). She was assessed as 1,923 GRT, 935 NRT, 3,400 DWT.

The ship was propelled by a compound steam engine, which had two cylinders of 42 cm (16 9/16 inches) and two cylinders of 90 cm (35 7/16 inches) diameter by 90 cm (35 7/16 inches) stroke. The engine was built by Waggon- und Maschinenbau GmbH, Görlitz. Rated at 1,200IHP, it drove a single screw propeller and could propel the ship at 10.5 knots (19.4 km/h).

== History ==
Celia was a Hansa A Type cargo ship built in 1943 as yard number 402 by Lübecker Maschinenbau-Gesellschaft, Lübeck, Germany for A. Kirsten, Hamburg. She wascompleted in January 1944. Her port of registry was Hamburg.

In May 1945, Celia was seized as a prize of war at Kiel. She was passed to the Ministry of War Transport. She was renamed Empire Gallant. The Code Letters GJGX and United Kingdom Official Number 180613 were allocated. Her port of registry was London and she was operated under the management of the London & Edinburgh Shipping Co. Ltd, Leith.

In 1947 Empire Gallant was sold to Borchard (UK) Ltd and was renamed Richard Borchard. Following the Israeli Declaration of Independence and the start of the Arab–Israeli War, Egypt instigated a policy of confiscating goods in transport to Palestine that would be of use to the Egyptian military effort. Richard Borchard was at Alexandria on 17 May. Her cargo of aluminium, dried fruit, machinery, motor vehicles, seaweed and tin was confiscated. It was claimed that she was a Zionist vessel owned in Italy. On 1 January 1949, Richard Borchard was intercepted 60 nautical miles (110 km) off Haifa, Israel by an Egyptian Navy corvette and minesweeper. She stopped after a shot was fired across her bows and was allowed to proceed after a rudimentary search for contraband goods had been made.

In 1960, Richard Borchard was sold to Fairplay Schleppdampfschiffahrt Reederei, Hamburg and renamed Fairwood. She was operated under the management of Richard Borchard GmbH. With their introduction in the 1960s, Fairwood was allocated the IMO Number 5111854. She served until January 1963 when she was scrapped at Sarpsborg, Norway by Østfold Skipshopphugging.
