= Hawkins Estate =

- Location within Gauteng Location within South Africa
- Coordinates: 26.146°S 28.082°E
- Country: South Africa
- Province: Gauteng
- Municipality: City of Johannesburg
- Main Place: Johannesburg

Area
  - Total: 0.18 km^{2} (0.069 sq mi)

Population (2011)
  - Total: 62
  - Density: 340/km^{2} (890/sq mi)

Racial makeup (2011)
  - Black African: 54.8%
  - Coloured: 1.6%
  - White: 43.5%

First languages (2011)
  - English: 52.5%
  - Zulu: 16.9%
  - Tswana: 11.9%
  - Northern Sotho: 5.1%
  - Other: 13.6%
- Time zone: UTC+2 (SAST)

Hawkins North is a suburb of Johannesburg, South Africa. It is located in Region E of the City of Johannesburg Metropolitan Municipality.
