= Savoy Estate =

- Location within Gauteng Location within South Africa
- Coordinates: 26.131°S 28.080°E
- Country: South Africa
- Province: Gauteng
- Municipality: City of Johannesburg
- Main Place: Johannesburg
- Established: 1948

Area
  - Total: 0.49 km^{2} (0.19 sq mi)

Population (2011)
  - Total: 1,532
  - Density: 3,100/km^{2} (8,100/sq mi)

Racial makeup (2011)
  - Black African: 47.8%
  - Coloured: 3.8%
  - Indian/Asian: 4.0%
  - White: 43.8%
  - Other: 0.5%

First languages (2011)
  - English: 61.3%
  - Zulu: 9.5%
  - Northern Sotho: 7.7%
  - Afrikaans: 5.1%
  - Other: 16.4%
- Time zone: UTC+2 (SAST)

Savoy Estate is a suburb of Johannesburg, South Africa. It is located in Region E of the City of Johannesburg Metropolitan Municipality.

Prior to the discovery of gold on the Witwatersrand in 1886, the suburb lay on land on one of the original farms called Syferfontein. It became a suburb in October 1948 and was originally owned by M.A. Zoccola who was from the same region of the Savoy Royal family.

It has traditionally been a centre for Johannesburg's Jewish community. Jewish residents made up 63.3% of the population in 1971.

During the apartheid era, it was classed as a "whites only" area under the terms of the Group Areas Act. Since the repeal of the Act in 1991, the resident-mix has become more cosmopolitan.
