= Mycobacterium doricum =

Scientific classification
- Domain: Bacteria
- Kingdom: Bacillati
- Phylum: Actinomycetota
- Class: Actinomycetes
- Order: Mycobacteriales
- Family: Mycobacteriaceae
- Genus: Mycobacterium
- Species: M. doricum

Binomial name
- Mycobacterium doricum Ausina et al. 1992, ATCC 51304

Species of bacterium

Mycobacterium doricum is a species of the phylum Actinomycetota (Gram-positive bacteria with high guanine and cytosine content, one of the dominant phyla of all bacteria), belonging to the genus Mycobacterium.

It is a scotochromogenic Mycobacterium.

== Type strain ==
Strain FI-13295 = CCUG 46352 = CIP 106867 = DSM 44339 = JCM 12405.
