= Fellside, Gauteng =

Fellside
- Location within Gauteng Location within South Africa
- Coordinates: 26.167°S 28.077°E
- Country: South Africa
- Province: Gauteng
- Municipality: City of Johannesburg
- Main Place: Johannesburg
- Established: 1904

Area
  - Total: 0.11 km^{2} (0.042 sq mi)

Population (2011)
  - Total: 309
  - Density: 2,800/km^{2} (7,300/sq mi)

Racial makeup (2011)
  - Black African: 27.8%
  - Coloured: 0.6%
  - Indian/Asian: 5.2%
  - White: 61.8%
  - Other: 4.5%

First languages (2011)
  - English: 58.3%
  - Afrikaans: 23.5%
  - Zulu: 7.2%
  - Sotho: 4.2%
  - Other: 6.8%
- Time zone: UTC+2 (SAST)
- Postal code (street): 2192

Fellside is a suburb of Johannesburg, South Africa. It is a small suburb located north-east of the city centre with Orange Grove to its north, south and east, with Houghton Estate to its west. It is located in Region E of the City of Johannesburg Metropolitan Municipality.

== History ==
Fellside lies on land that once made up the farm called Klipfontein, one of many large farms that make what is Johannesburg and its suburbs. The suburb was proclaimed in 1904. No houses were built before 1910 and the suburb's name possibly originates from the African City Properties Trust's founder, Sir Arthur Fell.

The houses tend mostly to be single storey houses originating from the 1920s. Unity Street is lined with mature plane trees.
