= Norwood, Gauteng =

Norwood
- Location within Gauteng Location within South Africa
- Coordinates: 26°9′31″S 28°4′28″E
- Country: South Africa
- Province: Gauteng
- Municipality: City of Johannesburg
- Main Place: Johannesburg
- Established: 1902

Area
  - Total: 0.87 km^{2} (0.34 sq mi)

Population (2011)
  - Total: 3,075
  - Density: 3,500/km^{2} (9,200/sq mi)

Racial makeup (2011)
  - Black African: 30.8%
  - Coloured: 2.0%
  - Indian/Asian: 11.7%
  - White: 53.1%
  - Other: 2.4%

First languages (2011)
  - English: 69.4%
  - Afrikaans: 11.1%
  - Zulu: 4.9%
  - Tswana: 2.5%
  - Other: 12.1%
- Time zone: UTC+2 (SAST)
- Postal code (street): 2192
- PO box: 2117

Norwood is a rapidly gentrifying suburb of Johannesburg, South Africa. It is located in Region E of the City of Johannesburg Metropolitan Municipality. It borders the suburbs of Orange Grove and Houghton. It is a garden suburb, with many of its homes dating back to the 1920s and 1930s. It is also one of the more popular dining spots in the city, renowned for its "celebrated restaurants" and ethnic mix of cuisine, mainly based on Grant Avenue. Other suburbs with a similar atmosphere, popular for their streetlife and dining include Melville, Newtown, Parkhurst and Greenside. The suburb has a "distinctive cosmopolitan atmosphere", and the residents comprise a mix of cultures including Jewish, Muslim, and West African. Norwood Primary School is based in the suburb. Some of its more well-known inhabitants include the anti-apartheid activist Helen Joseph and the actor Patrick Mynhardt.
