= Sydenham, Johannesburg =

Sydenham
- Location within Gauteng Location within South Africa
- Coordinates: 26.153°S 28.092°E
- Country: South Africa
- Province: Gauteng
- Municipality: City of Johannesburg
- Main Place: Johannesburg
- Established: 1905

Area
  - Total: 1.17 km^{2} (0.45 sq mi)

Population (2011)
  - Total: 3,368
  - Density: 2,880/km^{2} (7,460/sq mi)

Racial makeup (2011)
  - Black African: 29.3%
  - Coloured: 1.3%
  - Indian/Asian: 1.5%
  - White: 65.9%
  - Other: 2.0%

First languages (2011)
  - English: 69.1%
  - Zulu: 6.9%
  - Northern Sotho: 5.3%
  - Afrikaans: 4.4%
  - Other: 14.3%
- Time zone: UTC+2 (SAST)
- Postal code (street): 2192

Sydenham is a suburb of Johannesburg, South Africa. It is located in Region E of the City of Johannesburg Metropolitan Municipality. The suburb is surrounded by the area of Orchards, Orange Grove and other smaller suburbs.

== History ==
The suburb was surveyed for housing in 1905. The suburb's name comes from the name of the farm which originated sometime before the mid-1890s. In 1910, Sydenham was still quite rural and on 26 February of that year, the land was used by Frenchman Albert Kimmerling to fly a Voisin biplane a few hundred yards and proved that aircraft could be flown at a high altitude of 2,000 m (6,600 ft).

It has historically been a centre for Johannesburg's Jewish community, who followed the "tenement trail" to the northeast from more central areas of the city. In 1971, Jews made up 55.9% of the resident population.

In 1991, Sydenham was subject to the Abolition of Racially Based Land Measures Act, 1991. This abolished the Group Areas Act, in place since the 1950s, and classes Sydenham as a "whites only" area throughout most of the apartheid era.
