= Garay (surname) =

Garay, de Garay or Garai is a Basque or a Hungarian surname. Notable people with the name include:

- Antonio Garay (born 1979), American football player
- Blasco de Garay (1500–1552), Spanish navy captain and inventor
- Carlos Garay (born 1972), American football player
- Cecilia Suárez de Garay (born 1971), Mexican actress
- Ezequiel Garay (born 1986), Argentine football player
- Fernanda Garay (born 1986), Brazilian volleyball player
- Francisco de Garay (died 1523), Spanish conquistador, governor of Jamaica and explorer
- Hugo Garay (born 1980), Argentine boxer
- János Garay (1812–1853), Hungarian writer and poet
- János Garay (fencer) (1889–1945), Hungarian saber fencer
- Jesús Garay (1930–1995), Spanish football player
- Jesús Garay (director) (born 1949), Spanish film director and screenwriter
- Joaquin Garay (1911–1990), Mexican actor
- Joaquin Garay III (born 1968), American actor
- José Marcos Garay (born 1977), Mexican football player
- Juan Carlos Garay (born 1968), Ecuadorian football player
- Juan de Garay (1528–1583), Spanish conquistador
- Kenneth Garay, American sports journalist
- Leslie Andrew Garay (born 1924), American botanist
- Máximo Garay (1898–1960), Hungarian naturalized Chilean football manager
- Melker Garay (born 1966), Swedish author
- Nicole Garay (1873–1928), Panamanian poet
- Ramón Garay (1896–1956), Spanish film actor
- Ridl Garay (born 1997), Mexican volleyball player
- Sebastián Garay (born 1983), Argentine singer, musician and composer
- Sindo Garay (1867–1968), Cuban singer and composer
- Soo Garay, Canadian actress
- Tibor Garay (born 1923), Hungarian football player
- Val Garay (born 1942), American record producer
- Garay Asadov (1923–1944), Azerbaijani Red Army sergeant
