= Melker =

Melker is a given name and a surname. Notable people with the name include:

Given name

- Melker Ellborg (born 2003), Swedish footballer
- Melker Garay (born 1966), Swedish author
- Melker Hallberg (born 1995), Swedish footballer
- Melker Heier (born 2001), Swedish footballer
- Melker Svärd Jacobsson (born 1994), Swedish pole vaulter
- Melker Karlsson (born 1990), Swedish ice hockey player
- Melker Schörling (born 1947), Swedish billionaire businessman
- Melker Widell (born 2002), Swedish footballer

Surname (German for "milker")

- Daisy de Melker (1886–1932), South African nurse who poisoned two husbands for their life insurance money
- Nigel Melker (born 1991), Dutch racing driver
- Syd de Melker (1884–1953), South African rugby player

== See also ==
- Melker Sand Formation, geologic formation in Austria
- MELCOR
- Malkiar
- Mel Kerr
- Molkar
