= Manuel María Smith =

Spanish architect (1879 – 1956)

- Born: Manuel María Smith Ibarra; 4 January 1879; Bilbao, Biscay, Spain
- Died: 18 August 1956 (aged 77); Getxo, Spain
- Occupation: Architect
- Known for: Designing the San Mamés Stadium

Manuel María Smith Ibarra (4 January 1879 – 18 August 1956) was a Spanish architect. He carried out numerous constructions for the Basque bourgeoisie. He is considered the introducer of the English style in the Basque Country. He promoted low-density housing, considering it ideal for any social stratum. His best-known work was the San Mamés stadium, the football field in which Athletic Bilbao played its home matches until 2013.

== Early life and education ==
Manuel María Smith was born on 4 January 1879 in Ronda Street in Bilbao into a bourgeois family, which was descended from Irish and settled in the capital of Biscay in the 18th century. He was the second of seven siblings from the marriage between José Maria Smith Arangüena, of Irish descent, and Alejandra Ybarra Aldape.

After completing his baccalaureate studies at the Jesuit school of Orduña, where he stood out for his gift for design, Smith began in 1896 his architectural studies at the Madrid School of Architecture, where he stood out for his exceptional ability, receiving the medal for distinguished student from King Alfonso XIII in 1902 and obtained his degree in January 1904. He later returned to his hometown and married María Dolores Prado Mathurin, beginning his professional practice shortly after.

== Professional career ==
In 1903, Smith founded Smith Arquitectos on Gardoqui Street in Bilbao, later moving to Luchana Street, where the studio's offices are still located. Smith's first work, in 1904, was the house of Restituto Goyoaga, a friend and partner of the Smiths. A series of circumstances converged around this project, which would be repeated later until they came to characterize a large part of the architect's production, whose clientele was preferably made up of the Biscayan bourgeoisie, enriched as a consequence of industrial development. A large part of this group was united by ties of friendship or kinship with Smith and entrusted the technician with the design of their palaces and residences and, to a lesser extent, other real estate initiatives, such as hotels, housing estates, and tenement houses, as well as some factories and offices. Many of these industrialists and financiers acquired land in the municipality of Getxo, a town that throughout the second half of the 19th century and the first decades of the 20th century underwent a notable expansion and acquired an eminently residential character. In this way, Smith ended up being an architect especially linked to the typology of the single-family home with most of his prolific production being located in the aforementioned town.

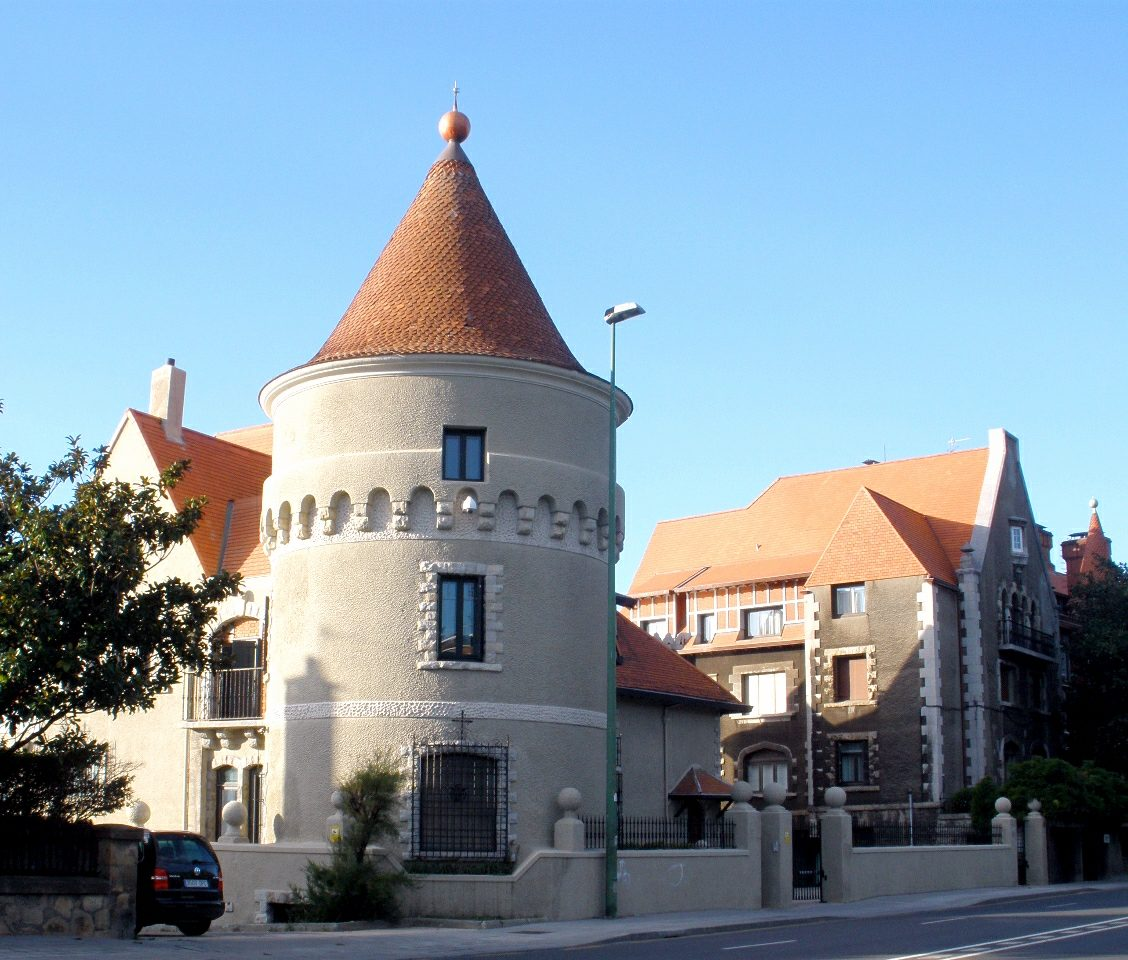
House of Luis Arana, in Las Arenas.

The Goyoaga house was followed by the houses of the Neguri Land Association. He soon acquired important clients in Bilbao society, building large residences and public buildings, reaching his peak between 1912 and 1930, as there was a boom in the economy due to the neutrality of the European war, thanks to which large industrial companies were created. As a result, his company also gained a great reputation, signing many projects and building many luxury houses, such as Victor Chavarri's Artaza mansion, on the Leioa road, the Martinez Rivas family mansion, Algorta; Emilio Ibarra's house, in Atxecoland (Getxo); Luis Lezama Leguizamon's palace, Getxon, and many other important buildings, such as the Hotel Carlton. Worthy of mention are Carlos Lewison's house, built in Neguri (Getxo) Port promenade, 1908 project; Luis Arana's house in Zuzazarte (Getxo); the new Atxuri station in Bilbao (1913–15), Tiro del Pichón, and the Antonio Garay Residence in Madrid are noteworthy from the first period.

In his first years as an architect, his name crossed the borders of Bilbao, but then the 1929 great economic crisis, which affected construction, put an end to it. The 1930s, however, was a radically different period as a result of the negative economic situation. The decrease in the number of commissions led Smith to participate in various competitions, although without success. His approach to rationalism dates back to this period, the style with which he designed Carlos Prado's tenement house.

== Style ==
An eclectic architect, Smith expressed himself with mastery in the "mountain" and "neo-Basque" styles and he is also considered the greatest introducer and representative of the English style in the Basque Country, especially the variations of the Old English and Queen Anne styles. For instance, Smith's first work, the Goyoaga house, was designed following the fashions in force in British architecture of the time, something that would be inherent to the architect's work both stylistically and in spatial conception. Smith himself recorded these affinities in an article titled "The English influence on our constructions".

The first stage of Smith's production spans until 1930. During those years, in addition to the styles of English descent, with which he created some of his most important works such as the Cisco House or the Artaza Palace, he also made important contributions to regionalist architecture, especially in its Basque and mountain variants.

Anglophilia in Biscay was evident in different areas since the Basque society showed its taste for English in sports, fashion, and architecture. Smith perfectly interpreted the different variants of that style of architecture and gave it a character that quickly took root within the sentiment of Basque society.

== Social life ==
Smith also participated in major cultural events in Bilbao, as a member of the Fine Arts Museums Committee, the Bizkaia Culture Committee, the Ethnographic Museum; he also promoted scholarships and exhibitions for artists and craftsmen.

== Later life ==
During the Spanish Civil War, Smith moved with his family to Bordeaux. Once the war was over, he returned to Bilbao and found a Basque Country in ruins. From then on he began the last stage of his career, diverting his work towards multi-family housing. In 1939, Smith received the delicate commission for the architectural complex of the Plaza de los Fueros in Guernica, a project full of representativeness, given the brutal destruction that this town had suffered as a consequence of the fateful bombing of 1937.

== Death ==
Smith died in the Burdin Bidarte family home in Getxo on 18 August 1956, at the age of 77. At his funeral, José Félix de Lequerica stated that "Manuel María Smith Ibarra taught us how to live", which is a reference to Smith's work in the single-family home and the complacency that his work caused among his clients.

== Important works ==
- House of Restituto Goyaga (Bilbao)
- Houses of the Sociedad de Terrenos (Neguri)
- Emilio Ibarra's house (Bilbao)
- Luis Arana's house (Bilbao)
- Hotel Carlton (Bilbao)
- Sota House (Bilbao)
- Kai Alde House (Bilbao)
- Artaza Palace by Víctor Chávarri (Leioia)
- Palace of the Martínez Rivas family (Algorta)
- Palace of Luis Lezama Leguizamón (Getxo)
- Palace of the Marquis of Olaso (Getxo)
- Palace of Bake Eder (Getxo)
- Residence of Antonio Garay (Madrid)
- San Mamés Stadium (Bilbao)
- Atxuri station (Bilbao)
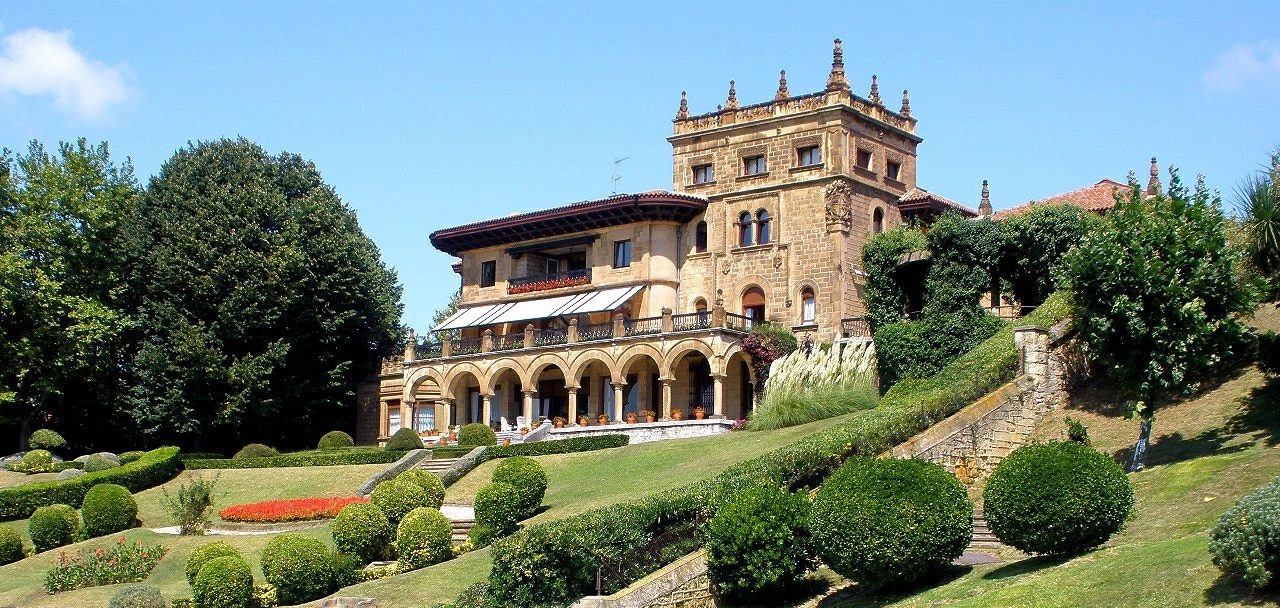
- Lezama Leguizamón Palace

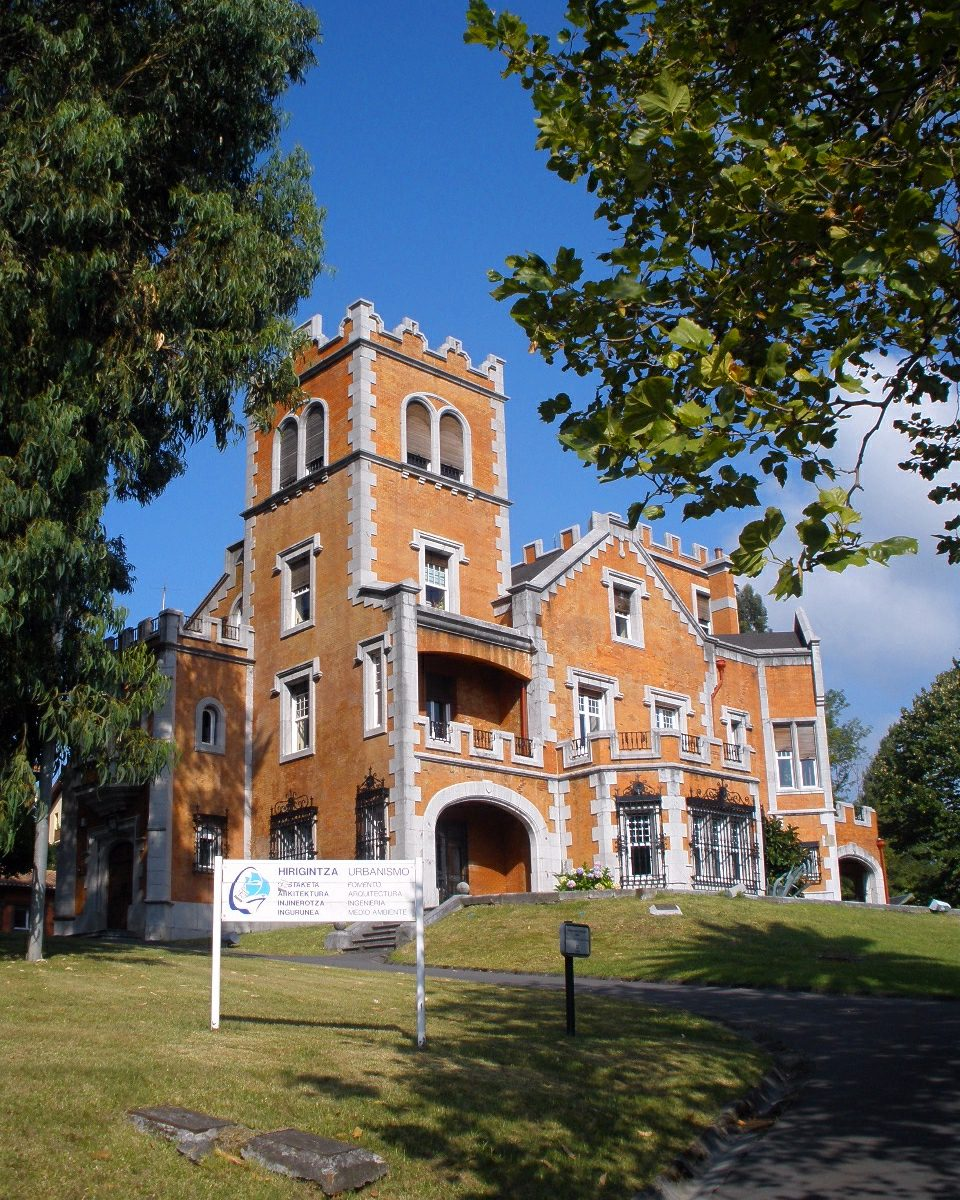
Santa Clara Palace

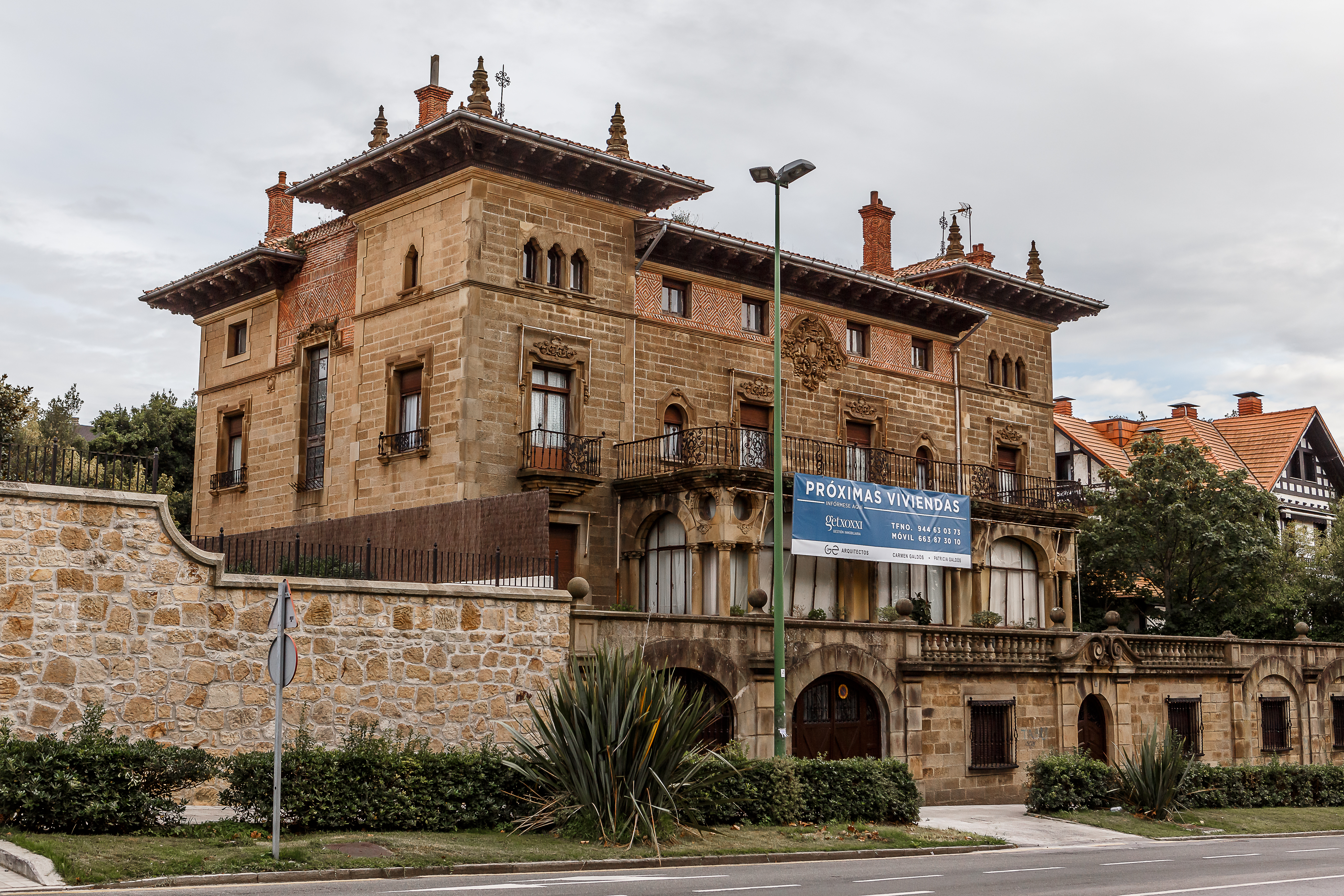
Palace of the Marquis of Olaso

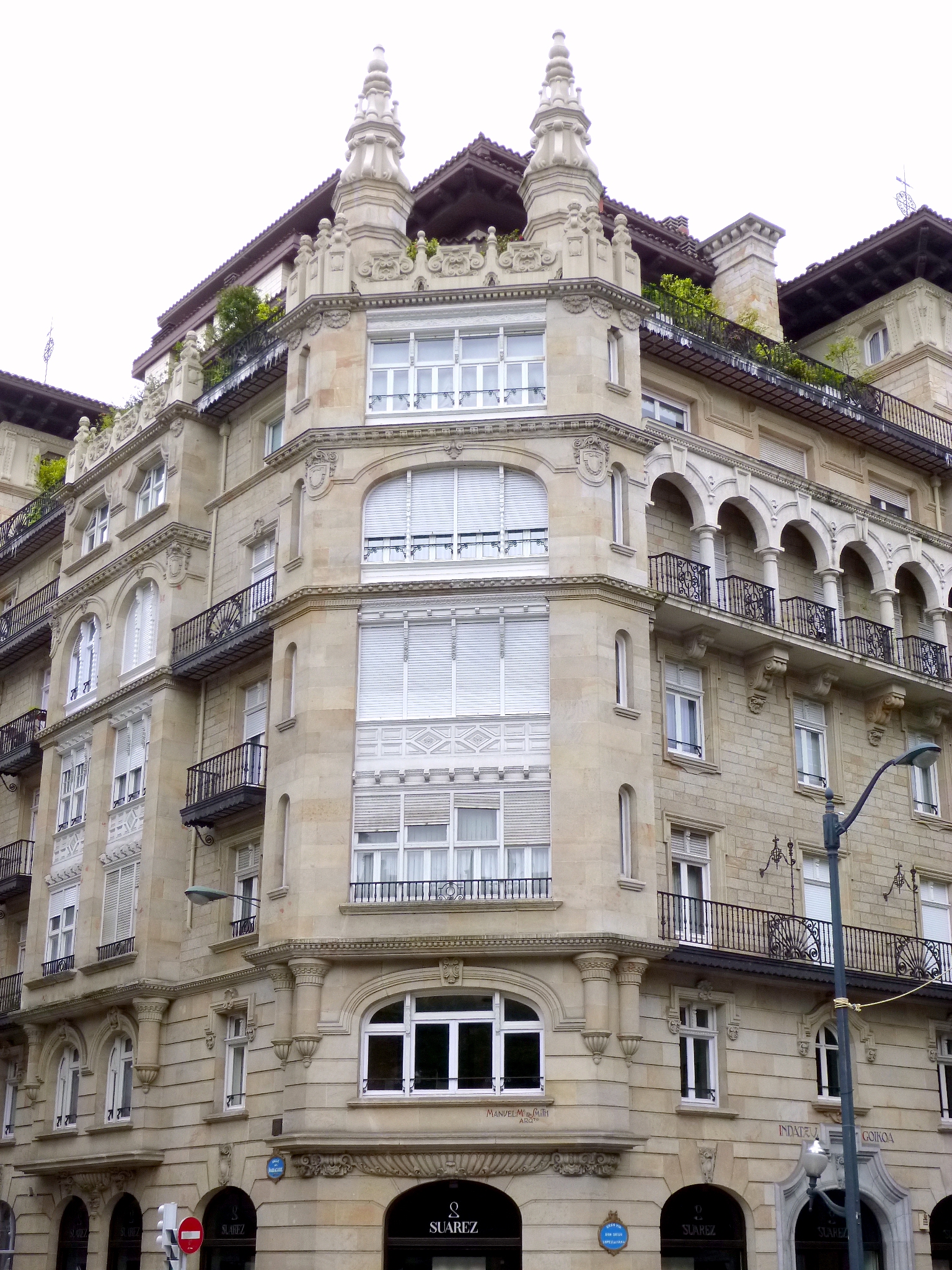
- Sota House

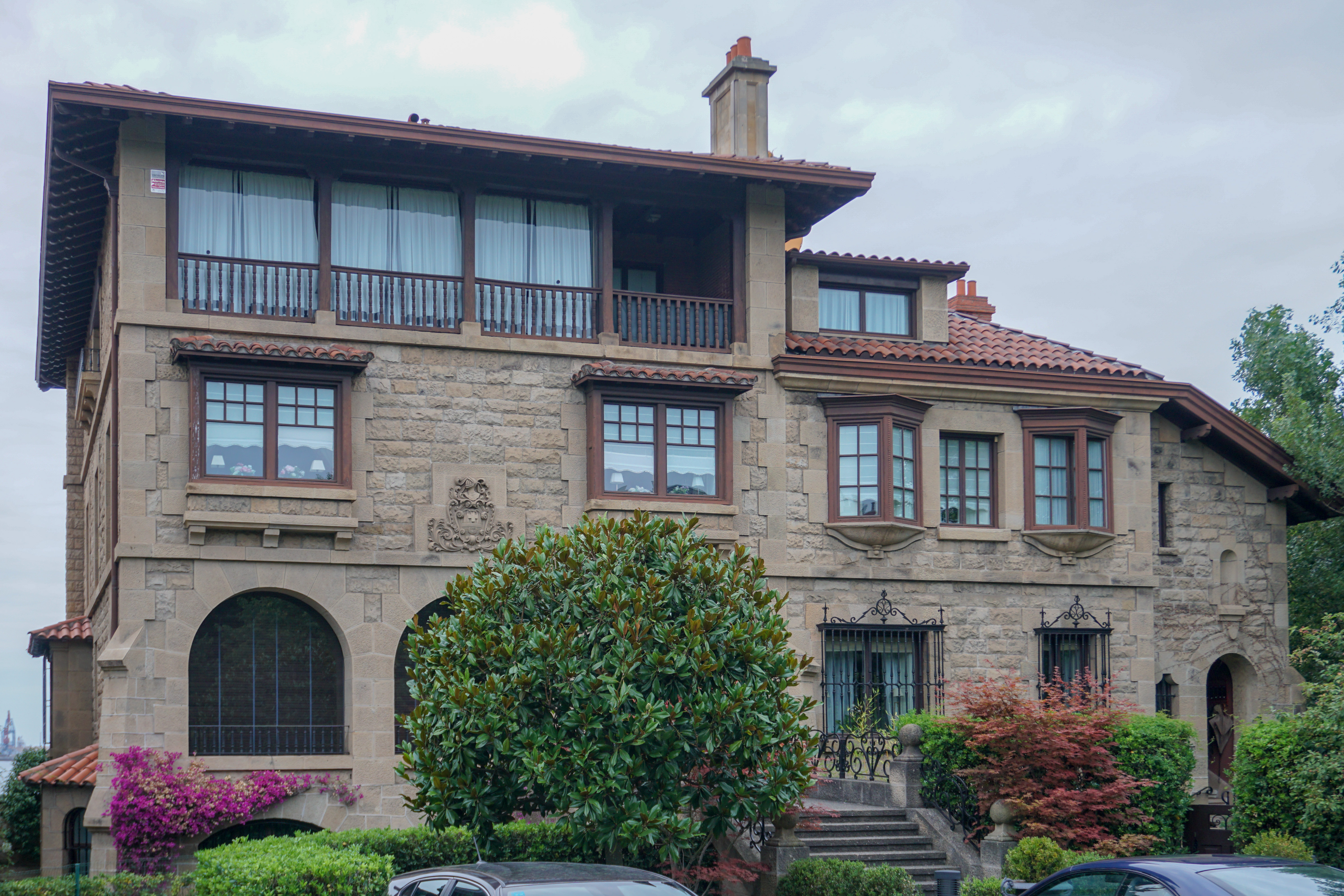
Kai Alde House

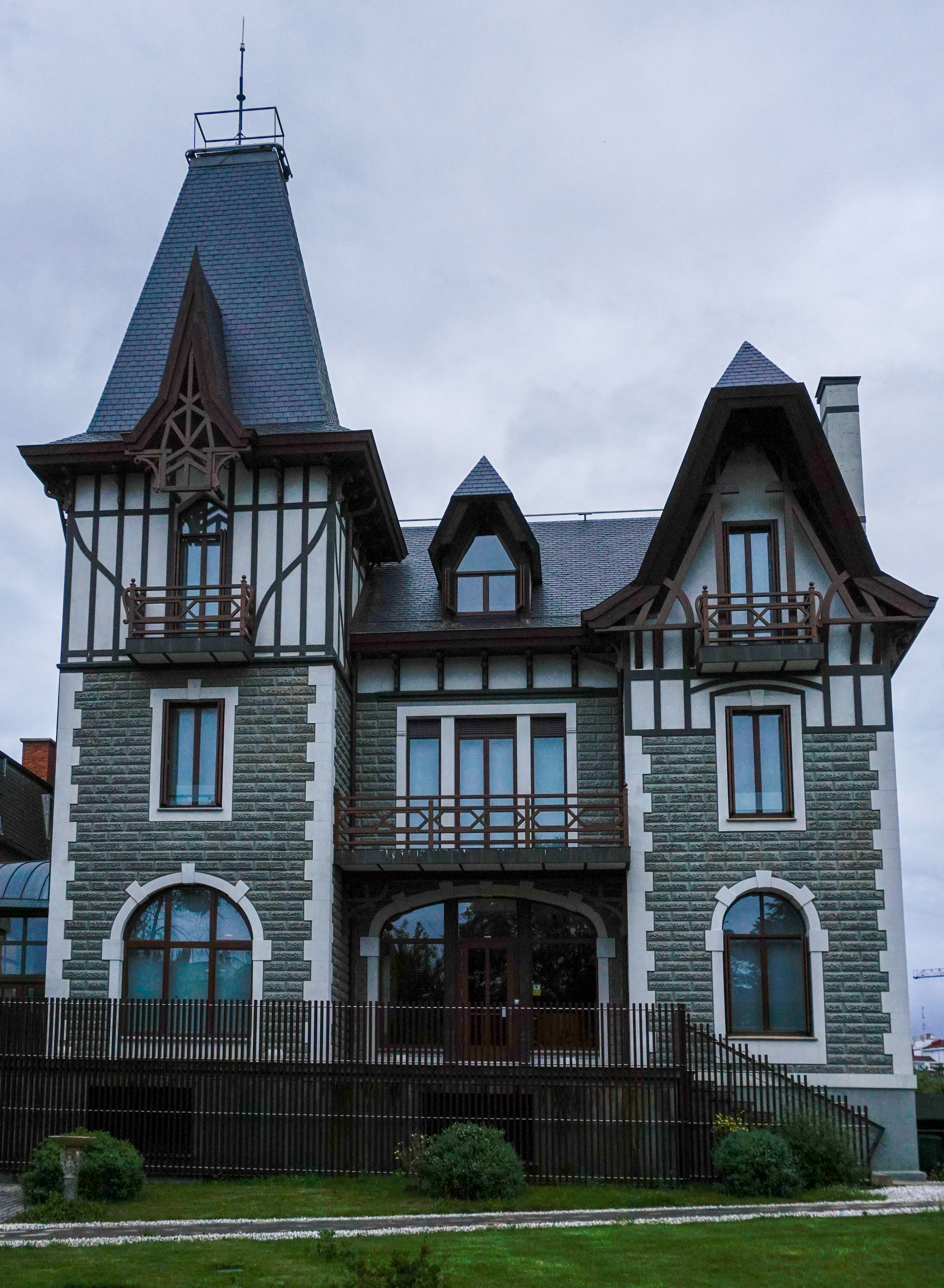
Bake Eder

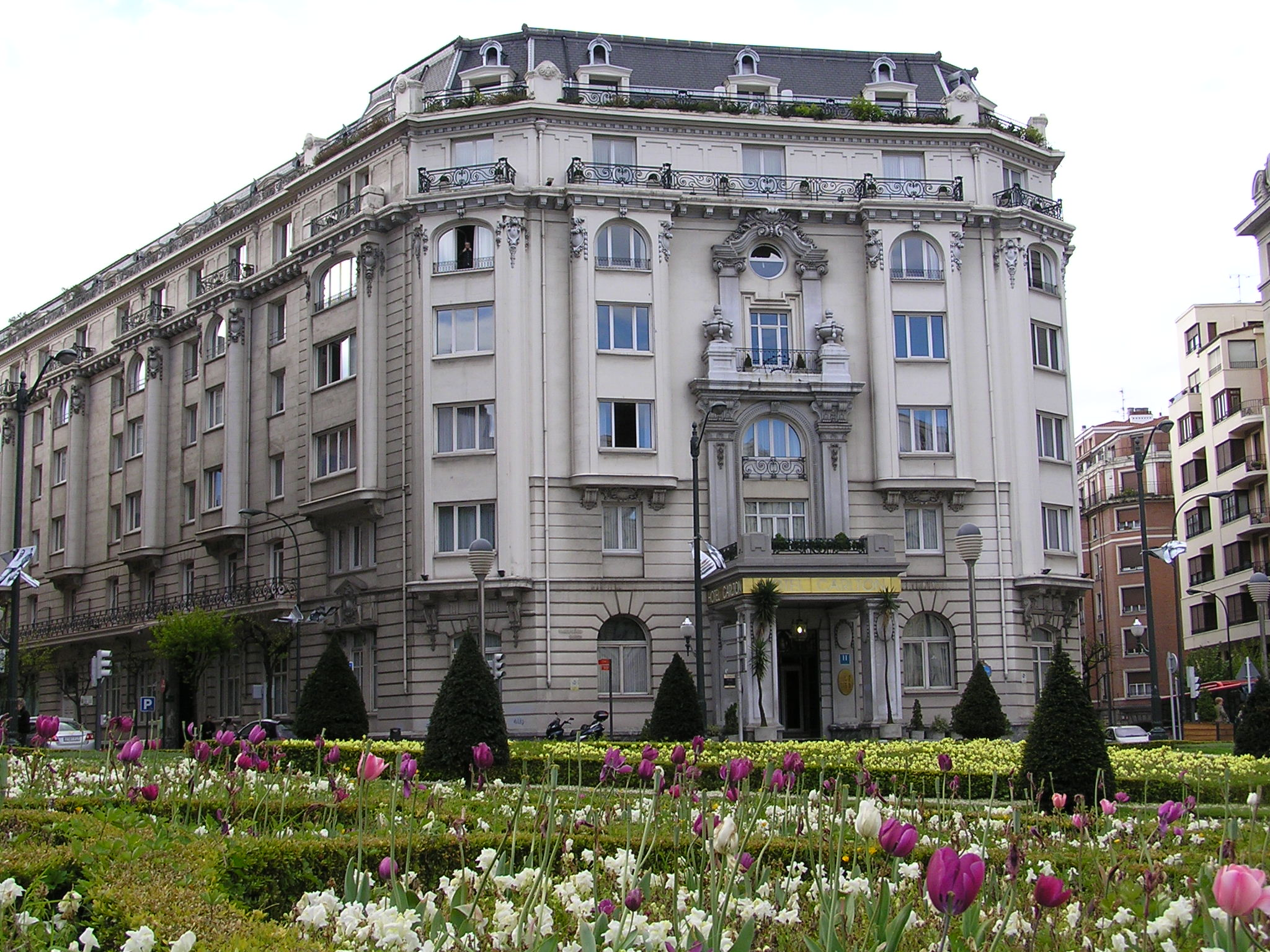
- Hotel Carlton

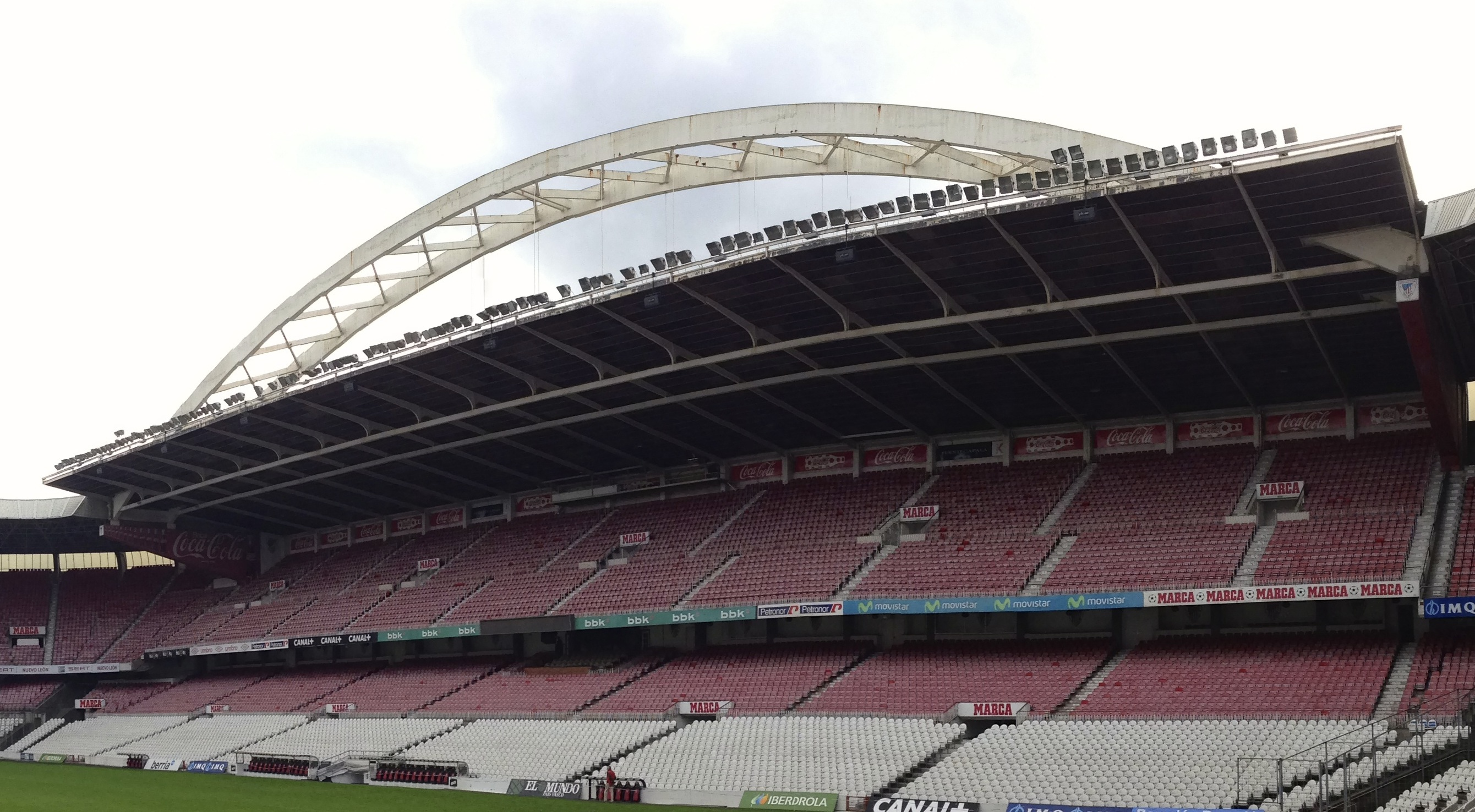
San Mamés Stadium shortly before being demolished

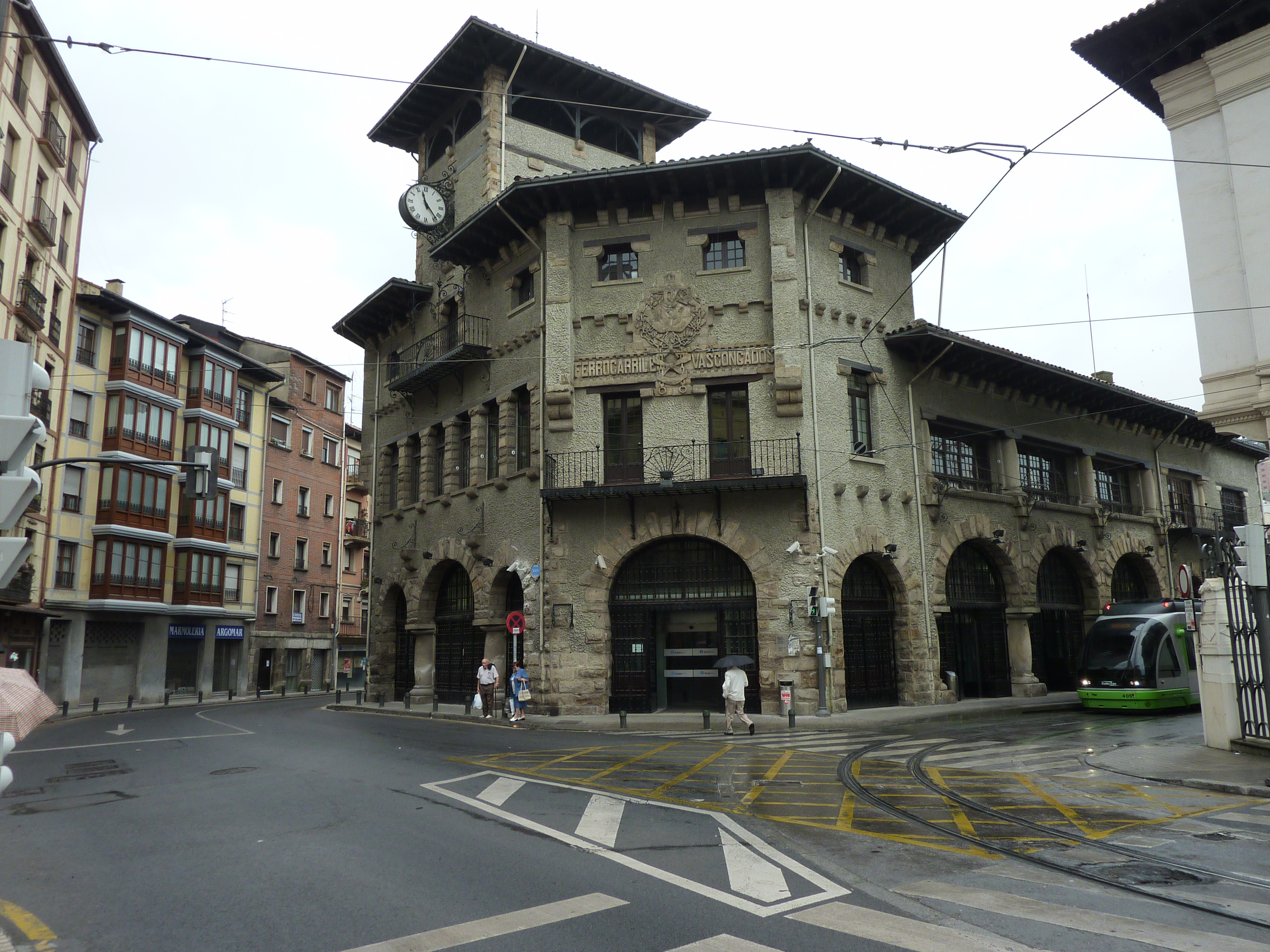
Atxuri station
