= San Mamés Stadium (1913) =

Stadium at Bilbao, Basque Country

Coordinates: 43°15′48.62″N 2°56′54.21″W

San Mamés
- La Catedral
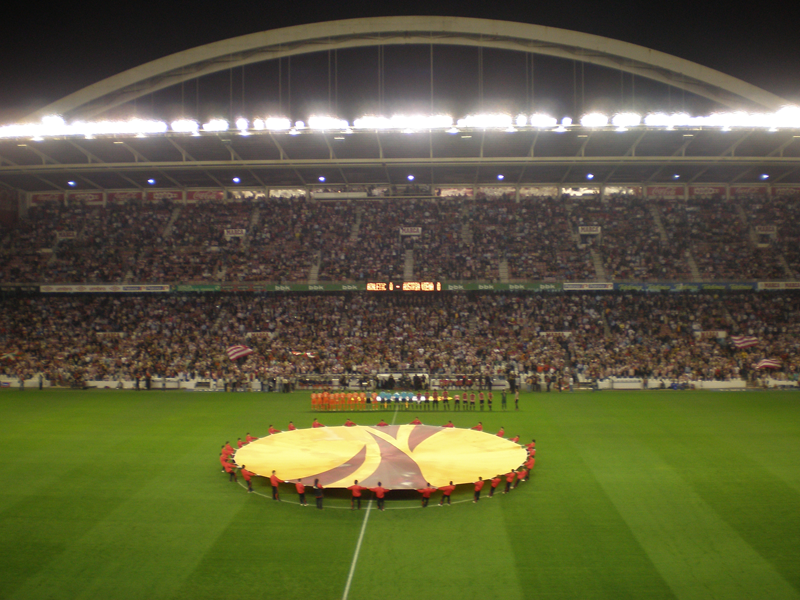
- San Mamés before a Europa League tie, 2009
- Interactive map of San Mamés
- Full name: Estadio San Mamés
- Location: Bilbao, Spain
- Owner: Athletic Bilbao
- Operator: Athletic Bilbao
- Capacity: 39,750
- Surface: Grass
- Field size: 105 x 68 m

Construction
- Built: 20 January 1913
- Opened: 21 August 1913
- Renovated: 1952, 1982
- Closed: 5 June 2013
- Demolished: 6 June 2013
- Cost: 50.000 ptas
- Architect: Manuel María Smith

Tenants
- Athletic Bilbao (1913-2013); Basque Country national football team (selected matches)

The San Mamés Stadium (Spanish: Estadio San Mamés [esˈtaðjo sam maˈmes]; also known as La Catedral [la kateˈðɾal], "The Cathedral") was a football stadium in Bilbao, Biscay, Spain. The stadium was the home of Athletic Bilbao, known as Los Leones de San Mamés-Bilboko lehoiak (The Lions of San Mamés). They are known as Los Leones because their stadium was built near a church called San Mamés (Saint Mammes). Mammes was an early Christian, born in A.D. 259, who was thrown to the lions by the Romans.

It closed on 5 June 2013 and was demolished thereafter. The club's new stadium, of the same name, was inaugurated on 16 September 2013.

== History ==
Opened in 1913, until its demolition it was Spain's oldest stadium (the oldest playing field being El Molinón) a characteristic that gave rise to the nickname La Catedral (The Cathedral), together with its revered status as one of the nation's most important venues, the devotion shown by the team's followers who attended the matches, the site's religious heritage and the fact that the city itself did not have a cathedral for some years afterwards (Santiago Cathedral did not receive the distinction until 1949). The nickname of the stadium is unconnected to the building that appears on the club crest, which is the Church of San Antón and its bridge, also featured on the Bilbao city coat of arms.

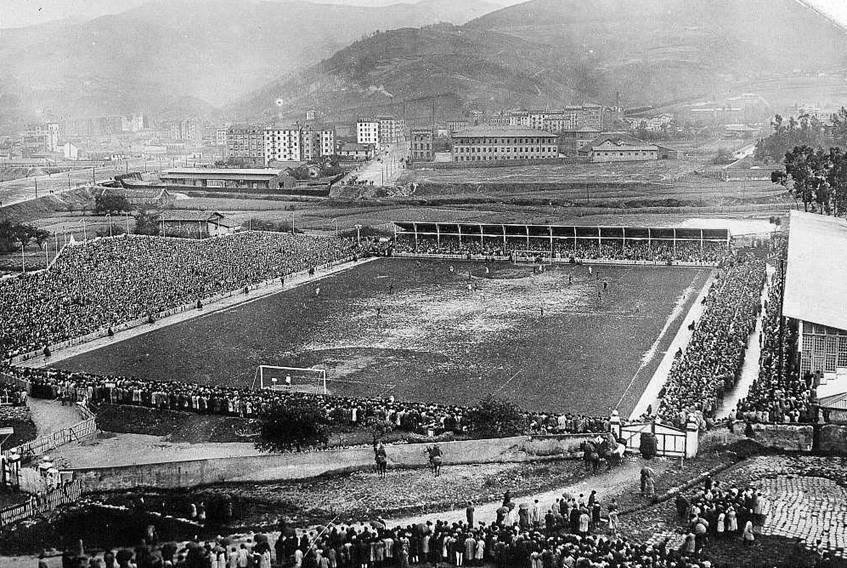
San Mamés in 1928

The first match at the stadium in August 1913 was a friendly between Athletic and Racing Club de Irún in a replay of the 1913 FEF Copa del Rey Final, which was the opening game of a triangular tournament also involving Shepherd's Bush F.C. The first goal was scored by the famous striker Pichichi. A 50th anniversary tournament of the same nature was heid in 1963, with Athletic defeating Fulham and Sporting CP in high-scoring matches.

San Mamés could seat almost forty thousand people and was known for the atmosphere of its crowds of fans would create on match-days.

The stadium was almost entirely rebuilt to host matches in the 1982 FIFA World Cup. Athletic's opponents in friendly matches that year included the national teams of England and Poland, while in 1998 the visitors to San Mamés were World Cup holders Brazil marking Athletic's centenary. Six Spain matches were played at the stadium between 1921 and 1967. In contrast, the unofficial Basque Country team played 26 fixtures of various types at San Mamés between 1915 and 2011, and the Biscay team played there three times.

In March 2006, a project was approved to replace the stadium with a new and larger version, thereby increasing the stadium capacity to 53,000. The New San Mamés Stadium is built on the former site of the Bilbao International Trade Fair, adjacent to the current stadium. Construction began in April 2010, and after it was three quarters completed, Athletic Club moved into their new home and the original San Mamés was demolished.

AC/DC's final concert of their Black Ice World Tour was held in the stadium, on 28 June 2010, it was the last gig of the guitarist and co-founder Malcolm Young.

=== Final months ===
The last Athletic match in La Liga at the stadium was a 0–1 loss to Levante on 26 May 2013; the goalscorer was Juanlu in stoppage time. Therefore, the final Athletic scorer was Fernando Llorente in the previous home fixture against Mallorca. However, the last competitive game took place on 2 June 2013 when the reserve team Bilbao Athletic (who occasionally play important matches away from their small stadium at the club training ground) drew 2–2 with Levante's reserves in their promotion play-offs.

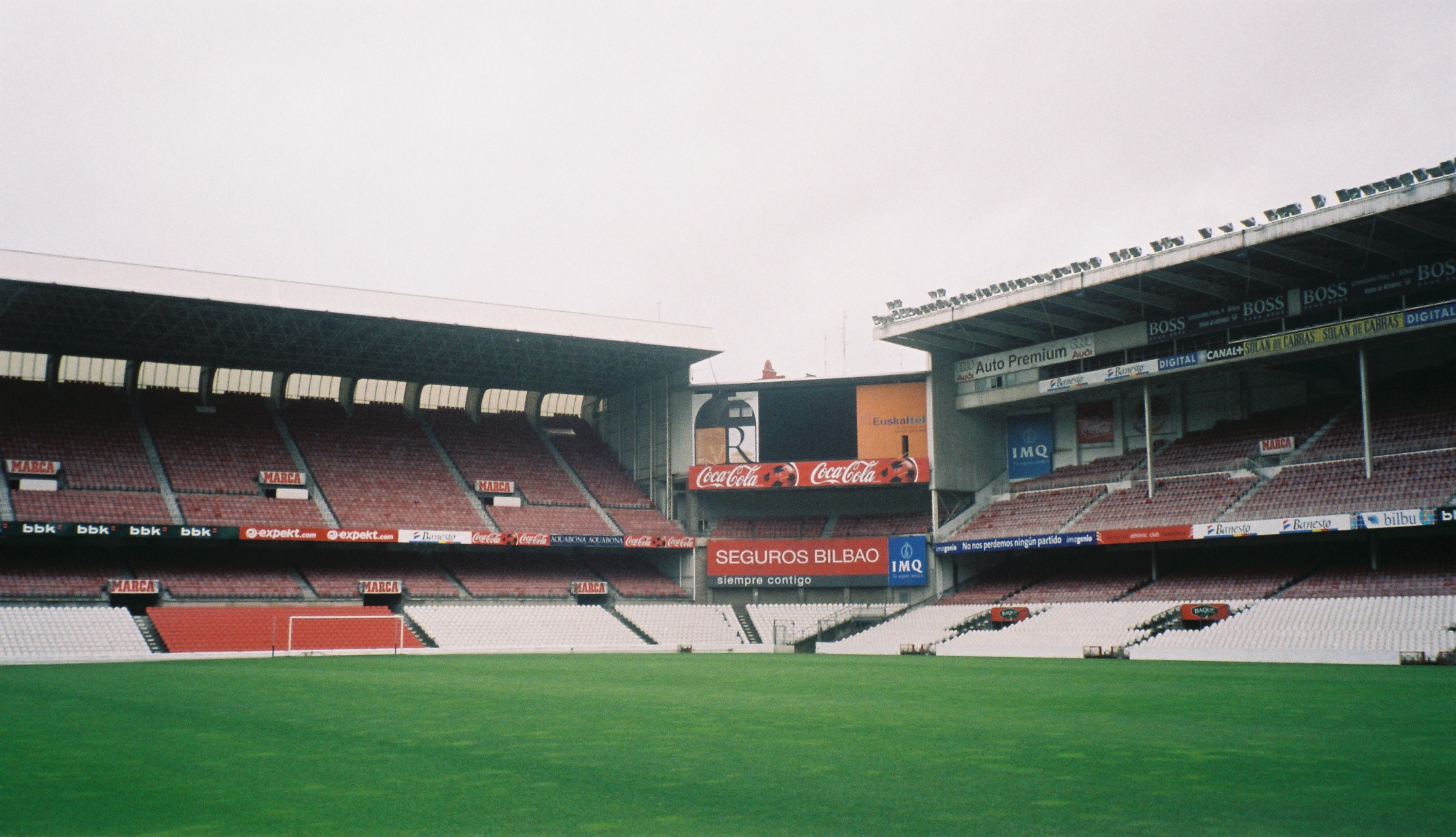
The Estadio San Mamés in August 2006

On 5 June 2013, Athletic played a farewell friendly match at the stadium to mark its closure, against a Biscay XI (a team comprising players born in the province based with other clubs). Athletic introduced several old heroes back onto the field as substitutes in the later stages: Orbaiz, Guerrero, Andrinua, Dani and Iribar, while others were also in attendance including 94-year-old Rafael Iriondo. Several of the Biscay players had begun their careers at Athletic, such as Expósito, Arriaga, Azkorra, Tarantino and Unai Medina, plus Beñat and Etxeita who had both already agreed to rejoin the club. Bizkaia won 1–0, with the last goal being scored by Alain Arroyo. In the days following the match, demolition of the stands began. By the time of its official centenary date in August 2013, little remained of the old stadium as work intensified to clear the site and complete its replacement.

The iconic arch over the main stand of the stadium (which originally supported its roof) was preserved in the demolition and moved in several pieces to the club's training ground, Lezama, where it was installed at the side of the pitch used by the reserves and women's team.

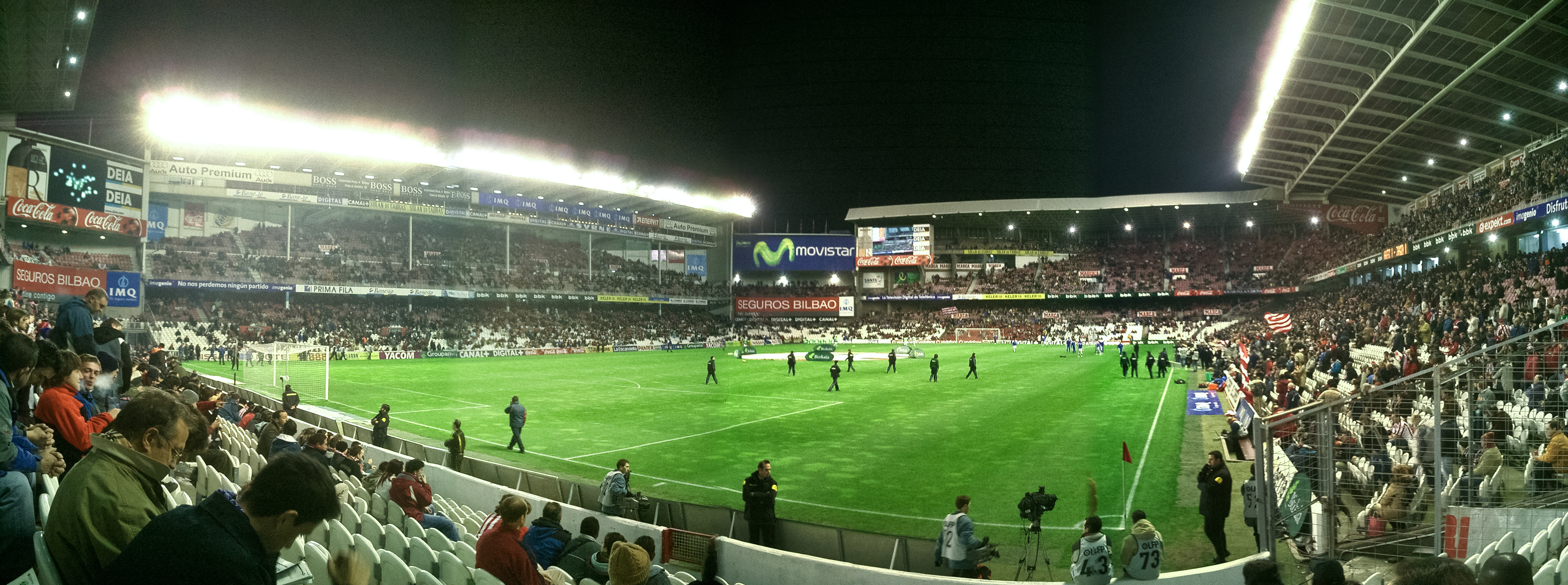
Panoramic view.

== Gallery ==
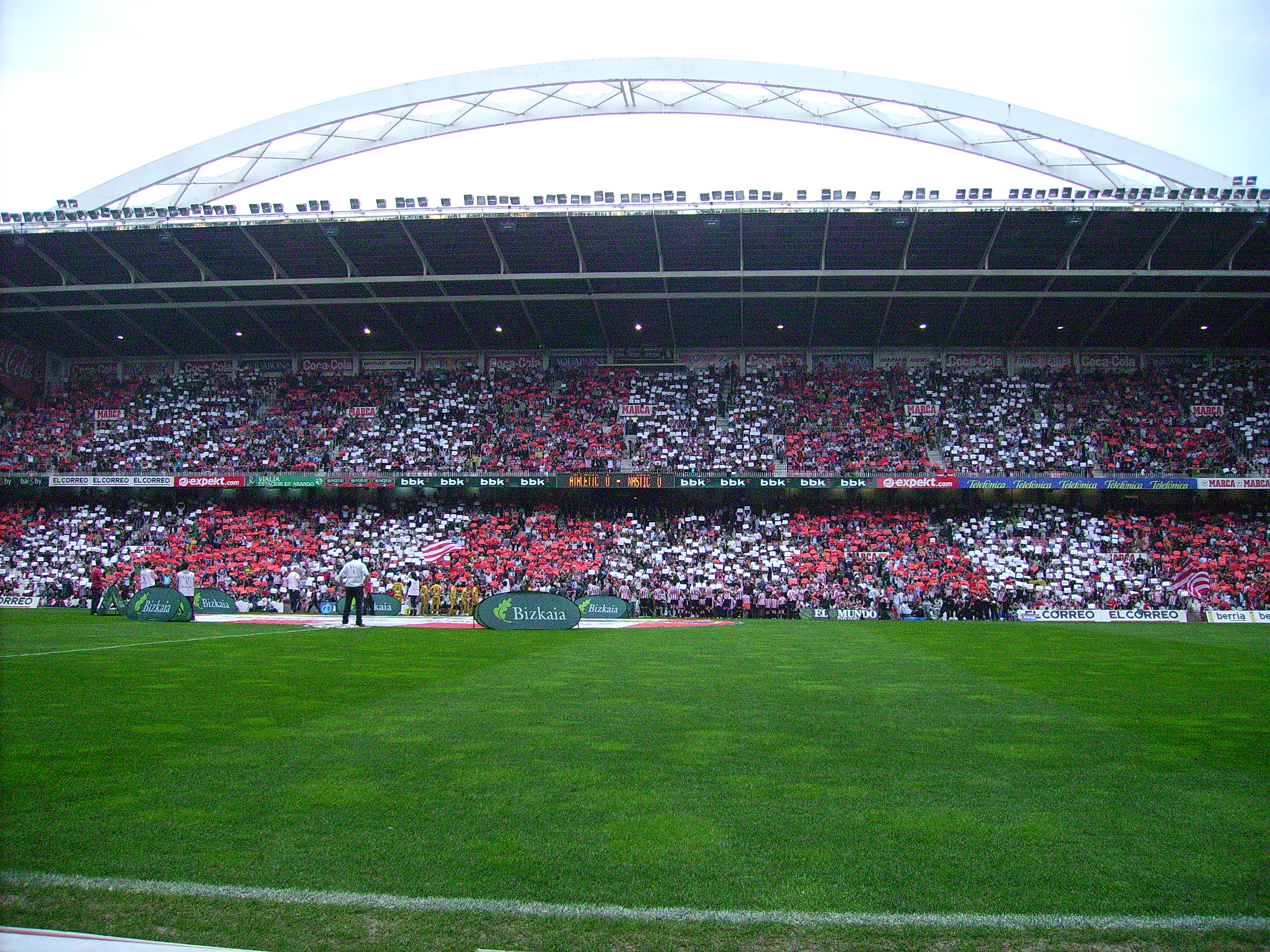
Main grandstand with arch

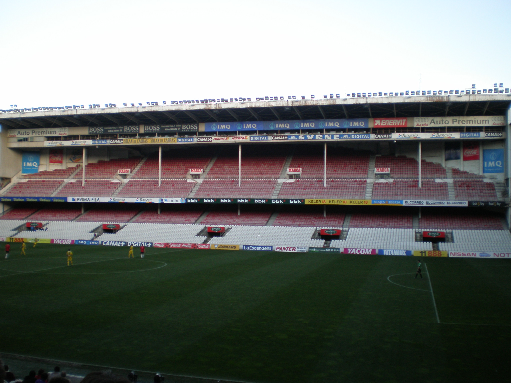
East stand

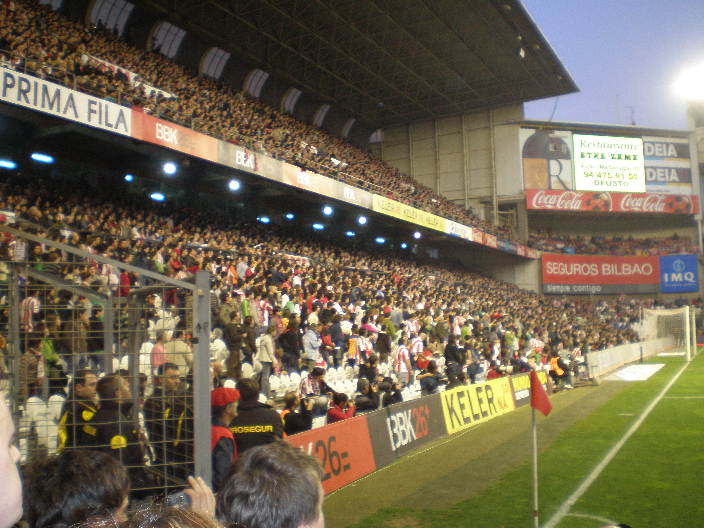
North stand

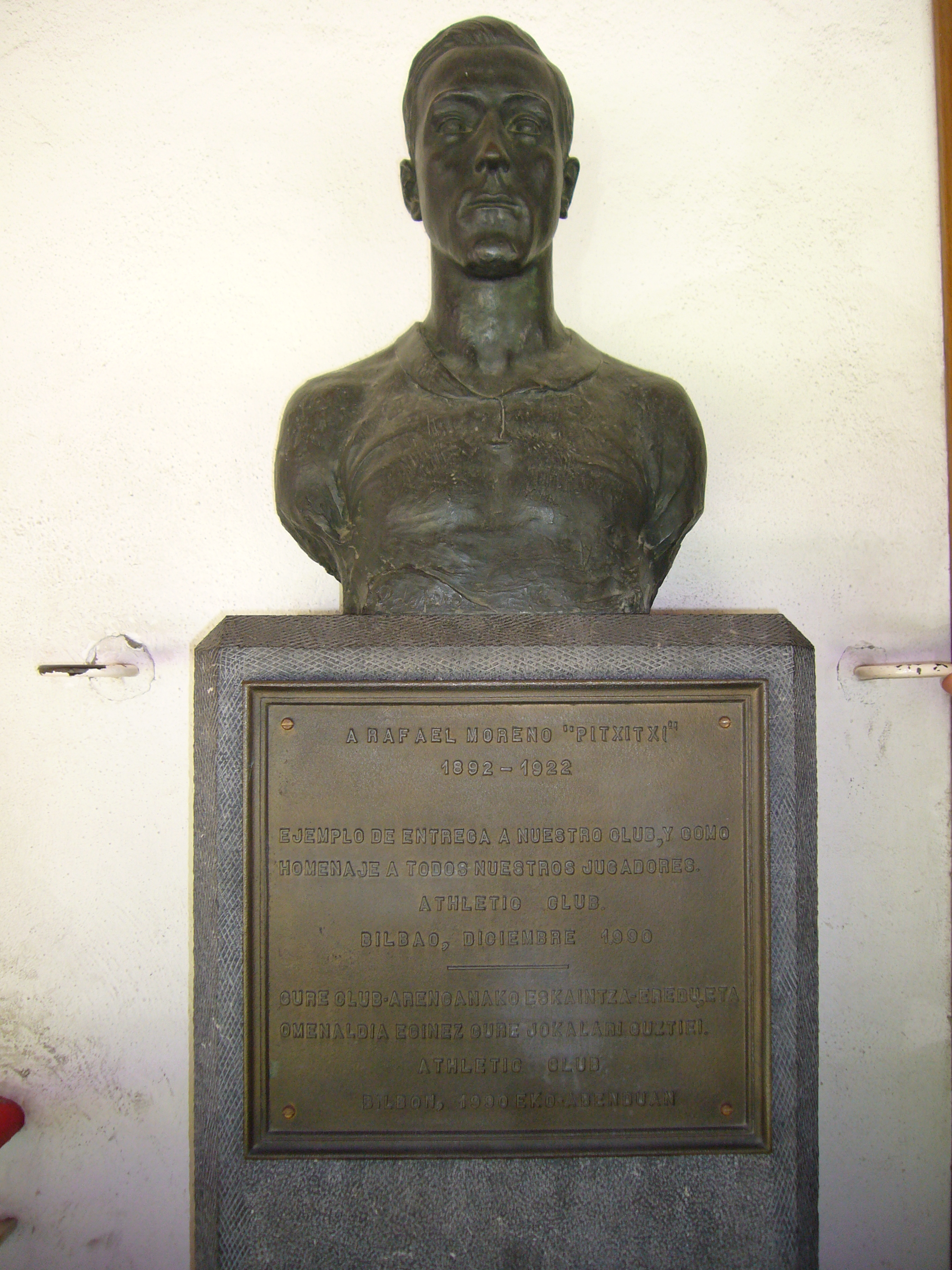
Bust of Pichichi in the directors' box

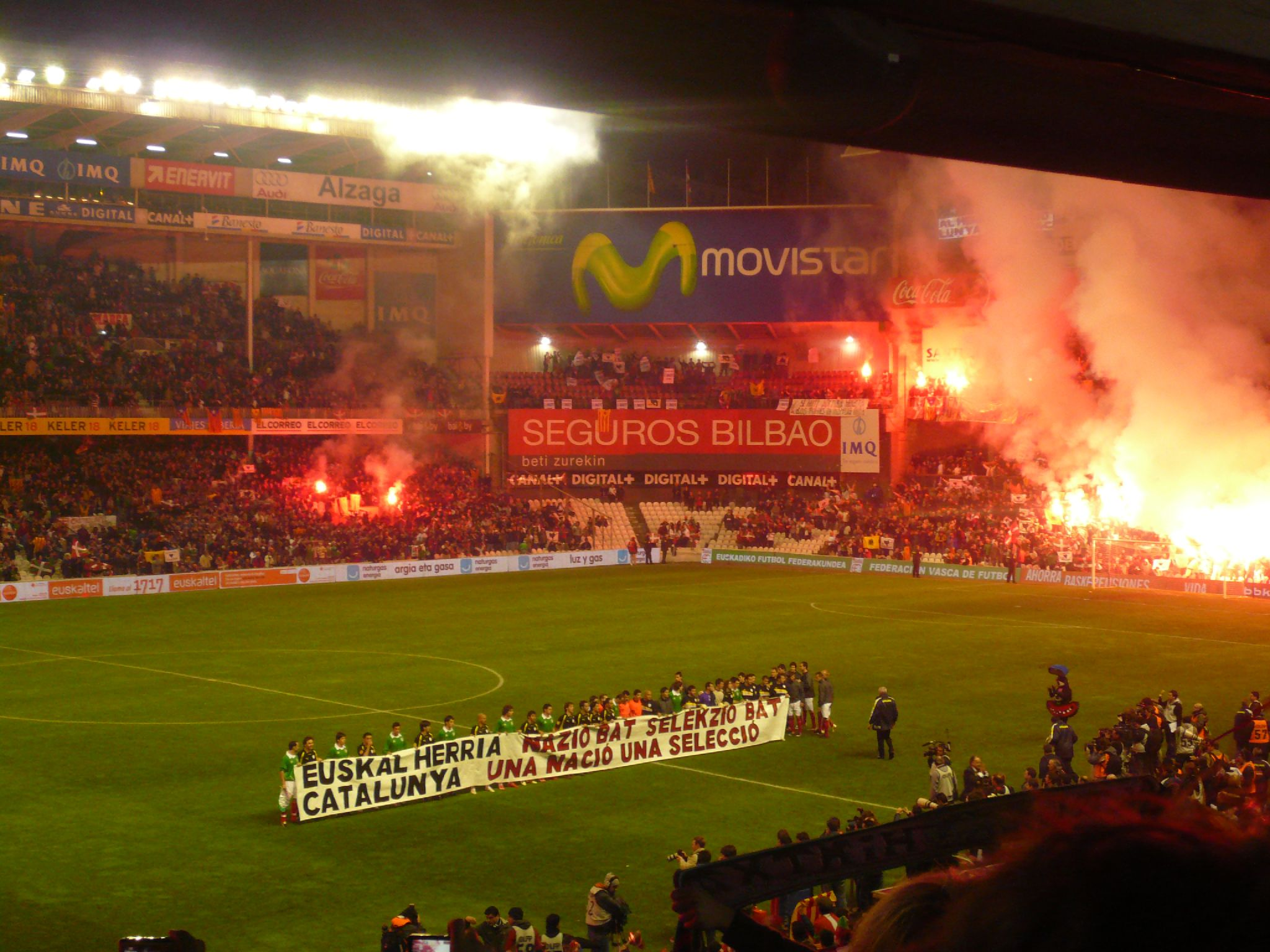
Teams line up for Basques v Catalans match with political banners and flares (2007)

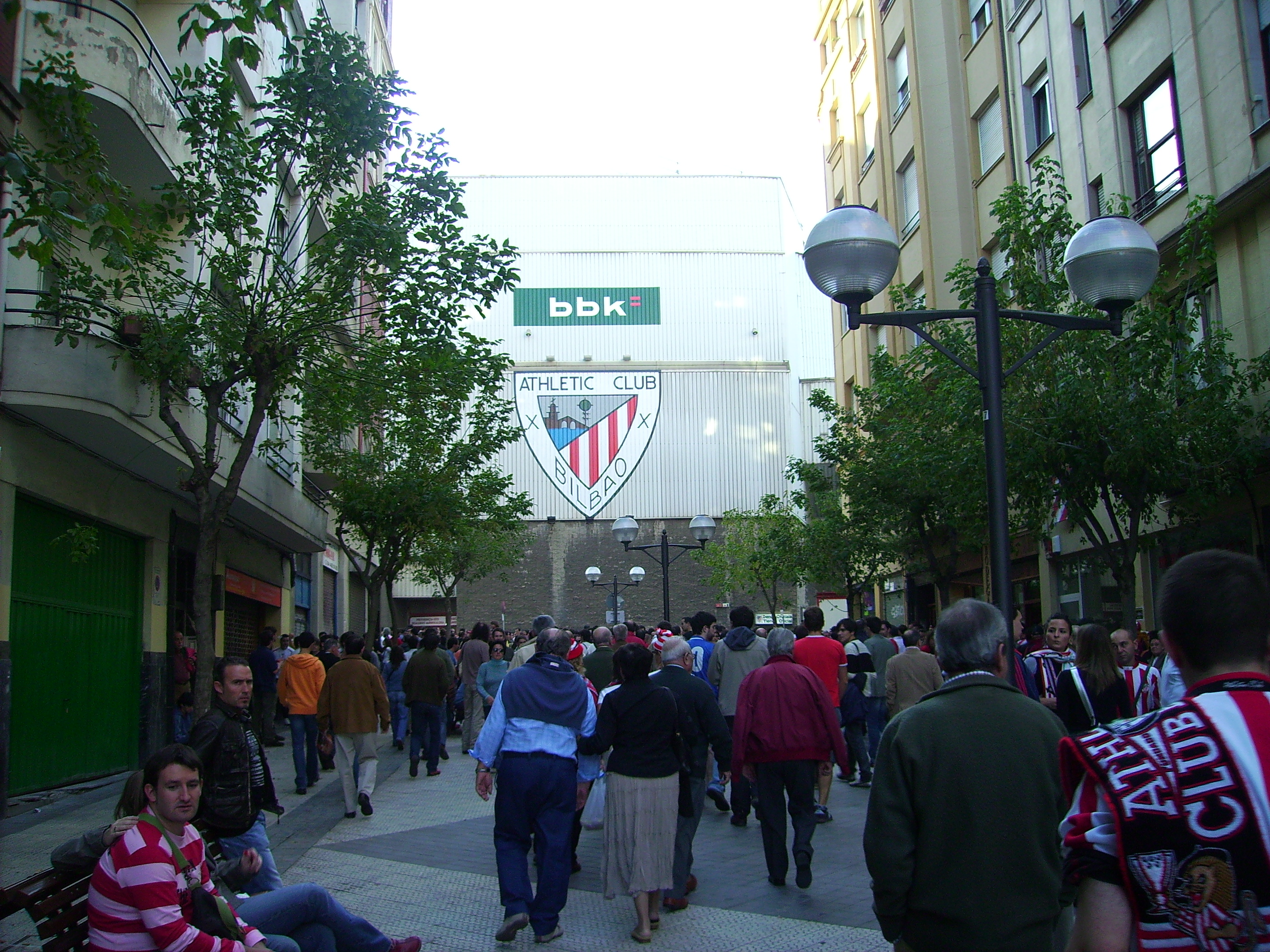
Outside the stadium, with the large painted club crest on the facade viewed from Pozas

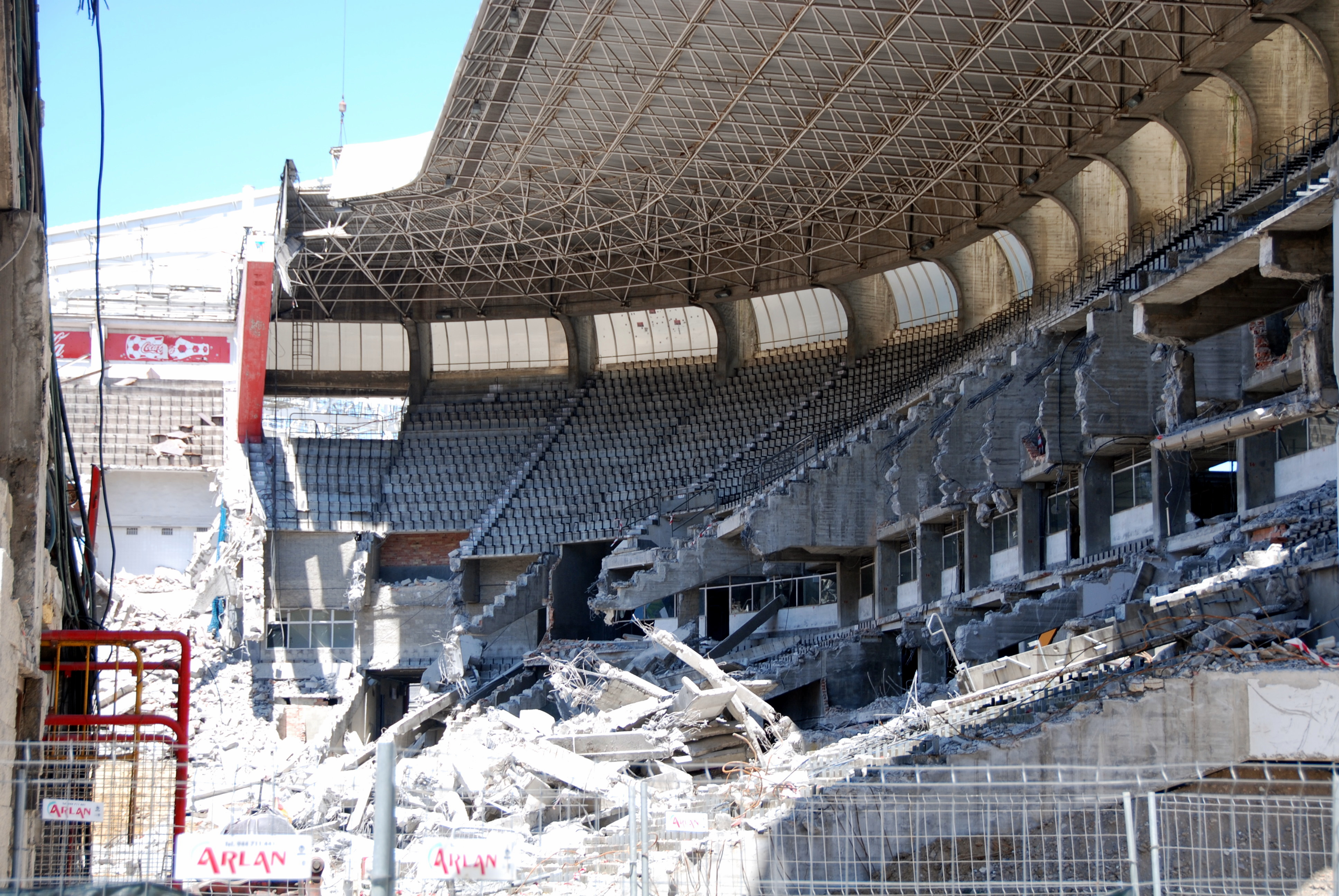
demolition of the west stand, (July 2013)

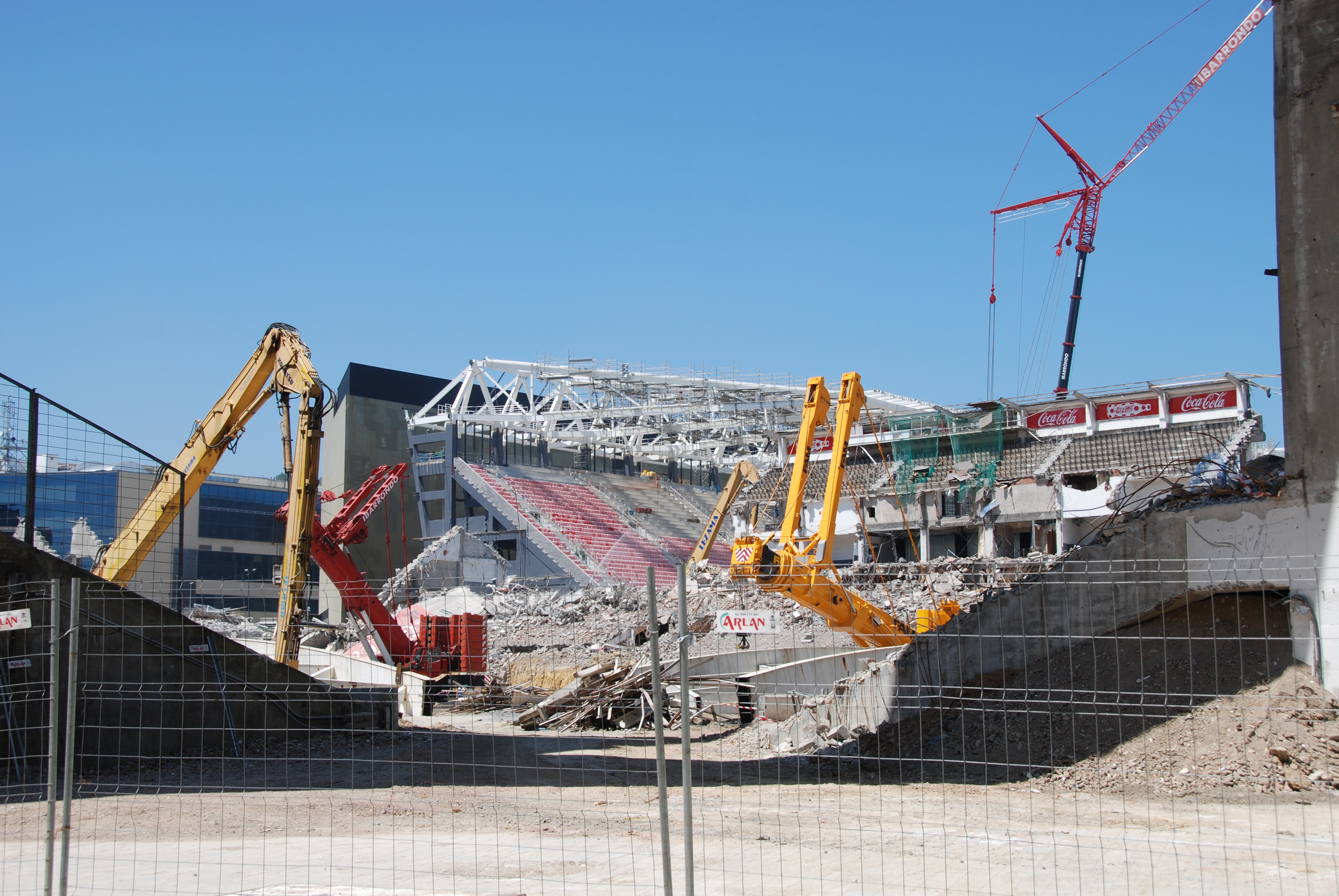
final hours of the main stand with the new stadium rising behind (July 2013)

== 1982 FIFA World Cup ==
The stadium was one of the venues of the 1982 FIFA World Cup, and held the following matches:

Date	Team 1	Result	Team 2	Round	Attendance
16 June 1982	England	3–1	France	Group 4 (first round)	44,172
20 June 1982	England	2–0	Czechoslovakia	Group 4 (first round)	41,123
25 June 1982	England	1–0	Kuwait	Group 4 (first round)	39,700

== Concerts ==
Concerts at San Mamés Stadium
Date	Artist	Tour	Attendance
4 June 2011	Shakira	The Sun Comes Out World Tour	25,000
