= Syd de Melker =

South African rugby union player (b. 1884, d. 1953)

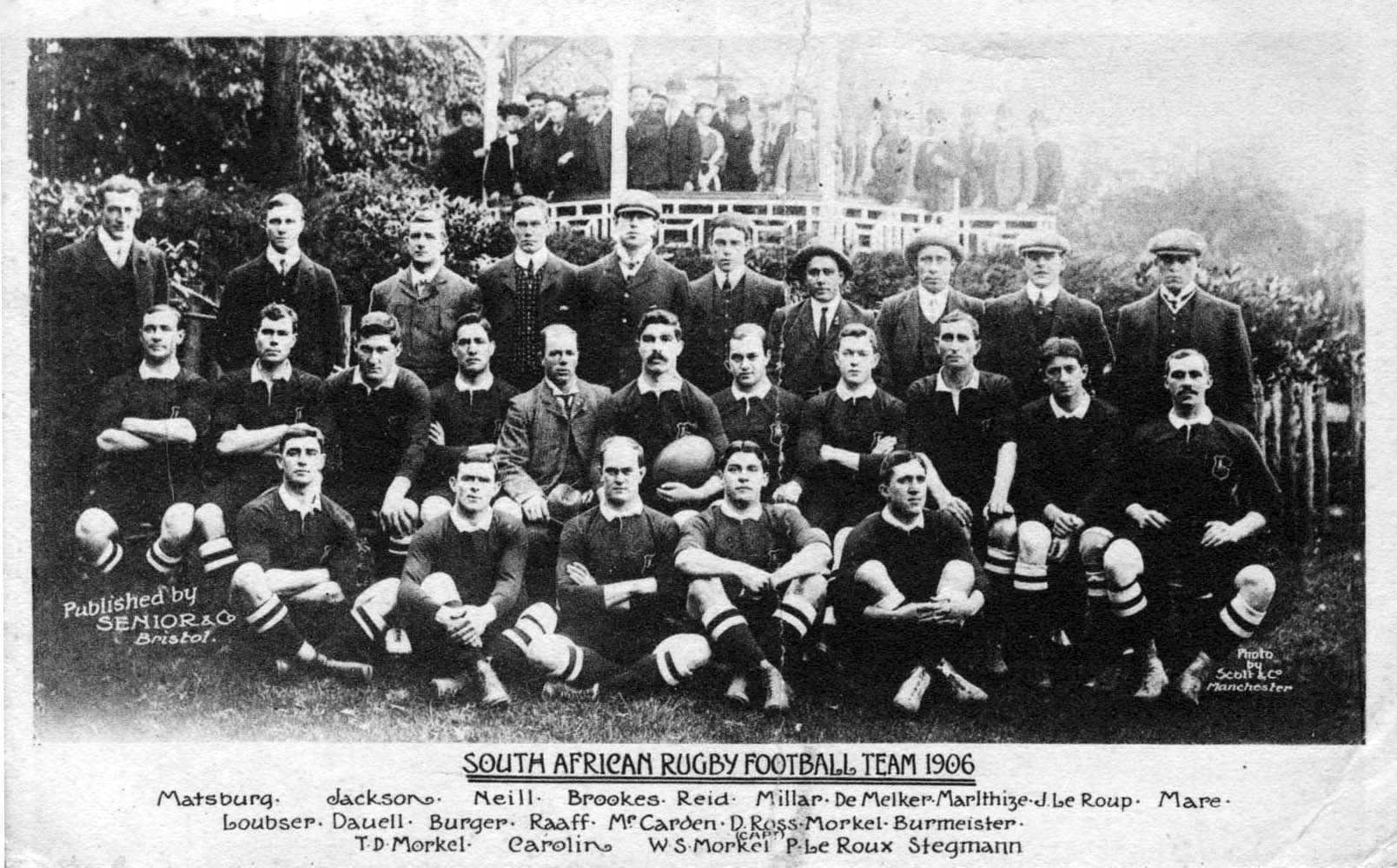
- The 1906 South African rugby team. De Melker is in the back row, fourth from the right.
- Born: Sydney Clarence de Melker; 31 March 1884 Kimberly, Cape Colony
- Died: 1 November 1953 (aged 69)
- School: Kimberly Boys High

Rugby union career
- Position: Centre
Provincial / State sides
Years	Team	Apps	(Points)
- Griquas
International career
Years	Team	Apps	(Points)
1903 - 1906	South Africa	2	(0)
- Correct as of 3 June 2019

Sydney Clarence de Melker (31 March 1884 – 1 November 1953) was a Cape Colony international rugby union player who played as a centre.

He made two appearances for South Africa from 1903 - 1906.

After retiring from rugby, de Melker worked as a plumber at a gold mine at Germiston, near Johannesburg. In 1930, de Melker was a widower and had a 19-year-old daughter named Eileen Norah. On 21 January 1931, de Melker married the twice-widowed Daisy Louisa Sproat, who took the name Daisy de Melker.

Daisy's 20-year-old son, Rhodes Cecil Cowle, died on 5 March 1932. Daisy was arrested and charged with using arsenic to kill Rhodes, as well as with using strychnine to kill her two previous husbands, William Alfred Cowle and Robert Sproat. Daisy was found guilty of murdering her son, but she was acquitted of murdering her husbands. Sydney de Melker and Eileen visited Daisy in prison before she was executed on 30 December 1932.

Sydney de Melker married two more times after 1932.
