= Malkiar =

Coordinates: 34°01′N 72°56′E

Malkiar is located in Haripur District in the North West Frontier Province of Pakistan, its geographical coordinates are 34° 0' 31" North, 72° 55' 31" East and its original name (with diacritics) is Malkiār.

The important personalities of Malkiar are Mr. Sardar Bahadur, Mr. Ghulam Haider, Colonel Siddique, Muhammad Ijaz, Muhammad Umer, Muhammad Abbas.
