= Marcos Garay =

Mexican footballer (born 1977)

Personal information
- Full name: José Marcos Garay Álvarez
- Date of birth: 10 July 1977 (age 49)
- Place of birth: Tonalá, Jalisco, Mexico
- Height: 1.77 m (5 ft 9 1/2 in)
- Position: Goalkeeper

Senior career*
Years	Team	Apps	(Gls)
2000–2009	Estudiantes	7	(0)
- * Club domestic league appearances and goals as of June 1, 2008

José Marcos Garay Álvarez (born 10 July 1977) is a Mexican retired footballer.

== Club career ==
He played for Tecos in the Mexican First Division.
