= Sebastián Garay =

Sebastián Garay Juan Sebastián Garay
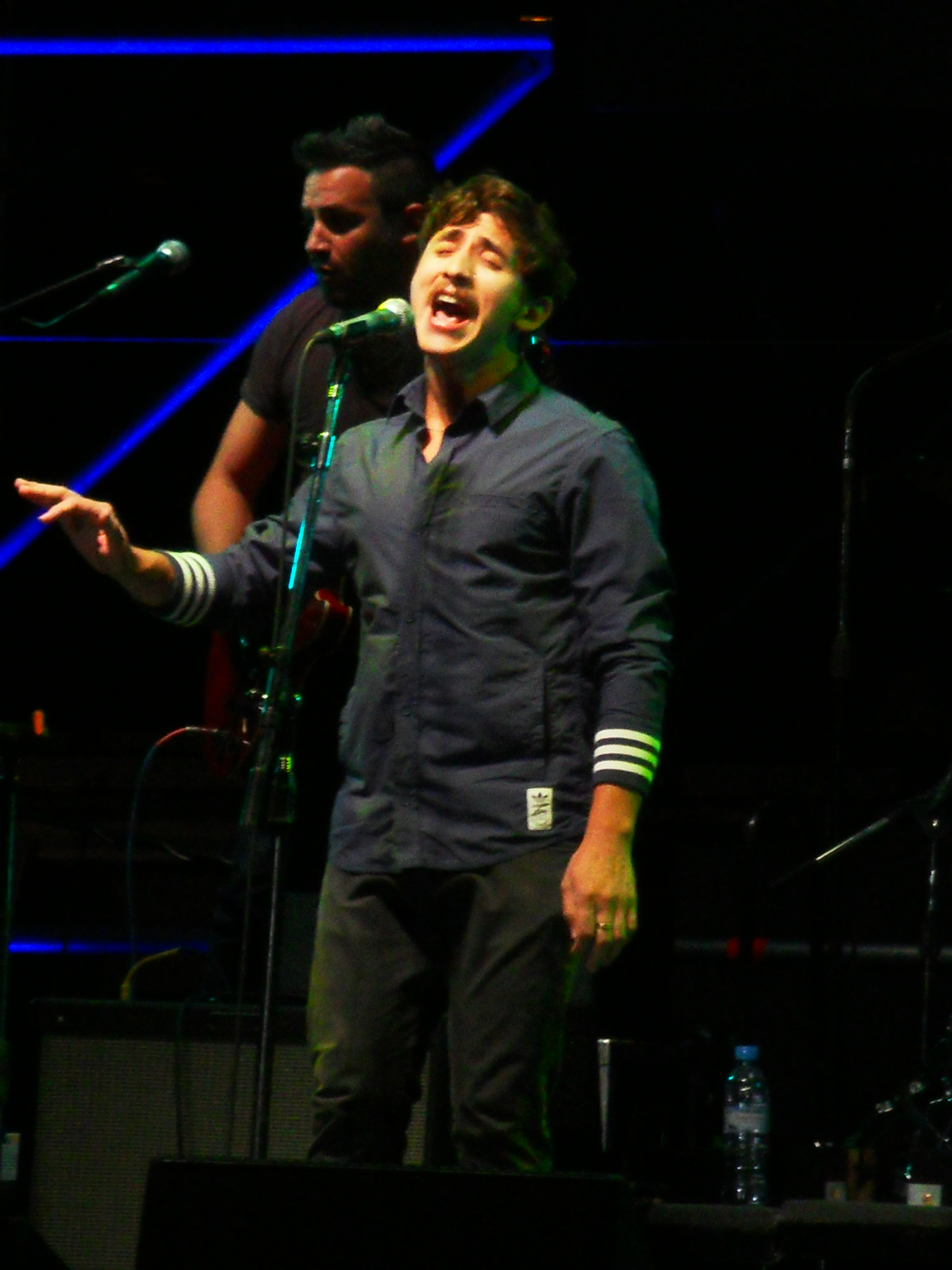
- Sebastián Garay (2013).

Background information
- Born: June 1, 1983 (age 42)
- Origin: Mendoza, Argentina
- Genres: Music of Argentina
- Occupations: Songwriter, singer
- Instruments: Guitar, voice
- Years active: 2005–present
- Website: sebastiangaray.com

Sebastian Garay (born June 1, 1983 in Mendoza, Argentina) is a singer, musician and composer of Argentine folklore. It is considered one of the outstanding personalities of the new generation of Latin American folklorists. He is currently in production of his third album, titled Animalidad.

== Discography ==
- Piel y barro (Skin and mud) – (2008)
- Folclor o no folclor (Folklore or folklore) – (2015)
