= Carlos Garay =

American football player (born 1972)

Profile
- Position: Quarterback

Personal information
- Born: February 9, 1972 (age 54)
- Listed height: 6 ft 0 in (1.83 m)
- Listed weight: 205 lb (93 kg)

Career information
- College: Hofstra

Career history
- New Jersey Red Dogs (1997–1998); Grand Rapids Rampage (1999); Carolina Cobras (2000)

Career AFL statistics
- Comp. / Att.: 72 / 134
- Passing yards: 814
- TD–INT: 16–6
- QB rating: 83.36
- Rushing TDs: 2
- Stats at ArenaFan.com

Carlos Garay (born February 9, 1972) is an American former professional football quarterback who played four seasons in the Arena Football League (AFL) with the New Jersey Red Dogs, Grand Rapids Rampage and Carolina Cobras. He played college football at Hofstra University.

== Early life and college ==
Carlos Garay was born on February 9, 1972. He played college football for the Hofstra Pride from 1992 to 1994. He threw 21 touchdowns in 1994. He also wrestled at Hofstra.

== Professional career ==
Garay played in 12 games for the New Jersey Red Dogs of the Arena Football League (AFL) in 1997, completing 17 of 28 passes (60.7%) for 217 yards, five touchdowns, and two interceptions while also rushing ten times for 36 yards and one touchdown. He also posted one assisted tackle. Garay played in nine games for the Red Dogs in 1998 but did not record any statistics.

Garay appeared in 13 games for the AFL's Grand Rapids Rampage in 1999, completing four of nine passes for 42 yards and a touchdown.

Garay played in all 14 games for the Carolina Cobras of the AFL during the 2000 season, recording 51 completions on 97 passing attempts (52.6%) for 555 yards, ten touchdowns, and four interceptions. He also rushed eight times for 38 yards and a touchdown and made one solo tackle. The Cobras finished the season with a 3–11 record.

== Personal life ==
Garay's uncle Tony Garay also played football and wrestled at Hofstra. His cousin Antonio Garay played in the NFL.
