= Daisy de Melker =

Executed South African serial killer (1886–1932)

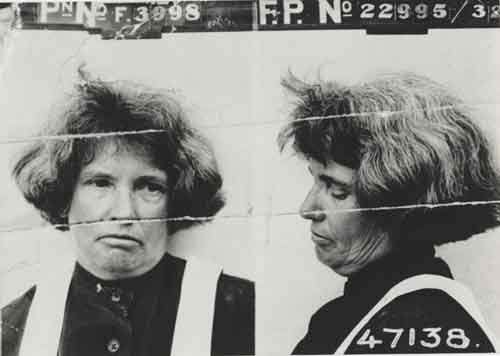
- Born: Daisy Louisa C. Hancorn-Smith; 1 June 1886; Seven Fountains, Cape Colony
- Died: 30 December 1932 (aged 46); Pretoria Central Prison, Pretoria, Union of South Africa
- Cause of death: Execution by hanging
- Spouse: 3
- Children: 1
- Conviction: Murder
- Penalty: Death

Details
- Victims: 3
- Span of crimes: 1923–1932
- Country: South Africa
- Date apprehended: April 1932

Daisy Louisa C. de Melker (née Hancorn-Smith; 1 June 1886 – 30 December 1932), simply known as Daisy de Melker, was a South African nurse who was accused of poisoning two husbands with strychnine for their life insurance money; all she was found guilty of, however, was poisoning her only son with arsenic for reasons which are still unclear. De Melker is the second woman to have been hanged in South African criminal history.

De Melker was accused of three murders but only convicted of one, the killing of her son. The charges of poisoning her husbands were never proven in a court of law. It was William Sproat, the younger brother of her second husband Robert, who accused De Melker because he wanted Robert's will in favour of De Melker declared invalid. De Melker refused to refund an alleged loan from her mother-in-law, Jane Sproat, to Robert; she regarded it as a gift and argued that it was not stipulated in the will as a loan. William won the civil case regarding the will, which ran concurrently with the murder trial, and was awarded costs. De Melker withdrew on the date Justice Greenberg sentenced her for murder. William's was a pyrrhic victory, however; to pay her exorbitant legal costs, De Melker had to sell off all her assets. She was declared insolvent and was eventually buried in a pauper's grave.

== Early life ==
Daisy de Melker was born Daisy Hancorn-Smith in Seven Fountains in what was then the Cape Colony. She was one of eleven children. When she was twelve, Daisy went to Bulawayo, Rhodesia (now Zimbabwe) to live with her father and two of her brothers. Three years later, she became a boarder at the Good Hope Seminary School in Cape Town. She returned to Rhodesia in 1903, but soon moved to the Colony of Natal and enrolled at the Berea Nursing Home in Durban.

On one of her holidays in Rhodesia, Daisy fell in love with a young man named Bert Fuller, a civil servant in the Native Affairs Department at Broken Hill. They planned to marry in October 1907. However, Fuller contracted blackwater fever and died, with Daisy at his bedside, on the very day they had planned to marry. Fuller left a will bequeathing £100 to his fiancée.

In March 1909, about eighteen months after Fuller's death, Daisy married William Alfred Cowle, a plumber in Johannesburg. She was 22 and he was 36. The couple had five children, four of whom died. The first two were twins who died in infancy; their third child died of an abscess on the liver; and the fourth suffered convulsions and bowel trouble and died at fifteen months old. Their last, and only surviving child, Rhodes Cecil, was born in June 1911.

== First purported murder: William Cowle (first husband) ==
Early on the morning of 11 January 1923, William Cowle became ill soon after taking epsom salts prepared by his wife. The first doctor who attended Cowle did not consider his condition serious and prescribed a bromide mixture. But Cowle's condition deteriorated rapidly; he took a turn for the worse soon after the doctor left. Daisy summoned the neighbours to help and called for another doctor. Cowle was in excruciating pain when the second doctor arrived. He foamed at the mouth, went blue in the face, and screamed in agony if anyone touched him until he died.

Faced with these symptoms, the second doctor suspected strychnine poisoning and refused to sign the death certificate. A postmortem was subsequently performed by the acting District Surgeon, Dr. Fergus. The cause of death was certified to be chronic nephritis and cerebral haemorrhage. Daisy, the sole beneficiary of her husband's will, inherited £1795.

== Second purported murder: Robert Sproat (second husband) ==
On 11 January 1926, 36-year-old Daisy married another plumber, Robert Sproat, who was ten years her senior. In October 1927, Robert became violently ill, suffering excruciating pain and severe muscle spasms similar to those experienced by Cowle. Robert recovered, only to suffer a second attack a few weeks later after drinking beer in the company of his wife and stepson Rhodes. He died on 6 November 1927. Dr. Mallinick, the attending physician, certified that the cause of death was arteriosclerosis and cerebral haemorrhage. No autopsy was performed. Following Robert's death, his widow inherited over £4000, plus a further £560 paid by his pension fund.

== Third purported murder (of which Daisy de Melker was convicted): Rhodes Cecil Cowle (son) ==
On 21 January 1931, Daisy married for the third time. Her new husband was a widower, Sydney Clarence de Melker; like her two previous husbands, he was a plumber. Before he worked as a plumber, Sydney had played for the Springboks (the South African national rugby team).

Late in February 1932, Daisy had travelled from Germiston on the East Rand to Turffontein, to obtain arsenic from a chemist. She used her former name, Sproat, and claimed that she required the poison to destroy a sick cat. Less than a week later, on 2 March 1932, Rhodes, aged 20, fell ill at work after drinking coffee from a thermos flask his mother had prepared for him. A fellow worker, James Webster, also become violently sick. Webster, who had drunk very little of the coffee, recovered within a few days, but Rhodes died at home at midday on 5 March. A postmortem followed and the cause of death was given as cerebral malaria. Rhodes was buried at New Brixton cemetery the following day; on 1 April, de Melker received £100 from Rhodes' life insurance policy.

Daisy's motives for killing her son Rhodes remain unclear. In the case of her first two husbands, the motive (if indeed she killed them) seemed to be financial gain. Rhodes seems to have been under the impression that he would come into an inheritance at age 21. One theory is that he was demanding more than his mother could give him and was becoming a burden to her. The most obvious answer is that he had become a disappointment to Daisy; she had pampered him all his life, but he rarely showed her any consideration in return. It is also possible that Rhodes had become suspicious of his father's and step-father's deaths and Daisy killed him to try and cover up her first two murders.

== Arrest, trial and execution ==
By this time, Daisy's former brother-in-law, William Sproat, raised his suspicions concerning his brother Robert's death to the authorities. On 15 April 1932, the police obtained a court order permitting them to exhume the bodies of Robert, Cowle and Rhodes. Rhodes' remains were found to be in an unusually good state of preservation, which is characteristic of the presence of arsenic in large quantities. A state forensic pathologist was able to isolate traces of arsenic in the viscera, backbone and hair. Although the bodies of Cowle and Robert Sproat were largely decomposed, traces of strychnine were found in the vertebrae of each man. Their bones also had a pinkish discolouration, suggesting that the men had taken pink strychnine, which was common at the time. Traces of arsenic were also found in the hair and fingernails of James Webster, Rhodes' surviving colleague.

One week later, De Melker was arrested and charged with the murders of all three men. Public interest in the case grew, and newspapers gave the story a great deal of coverage. The Turffontein chemist, Mr. Abraham Spilkin, from whom she had bought the arsenic that killed her son, contacted police after he recognized de Melker from a newspaper photograph as being "Mrs D.L. Sproat", who had signed the poisons register.

The De Melker trial lasted thirty days. Sixty witnesses were called for the Crown and less than half this number for the defence. To present the forensic evidence, the Crown employed the services of Dr. J.M. Watt, an expert toxicologist and professor of pharmacology at Witwatersrand University. In summing up, before giving his verdict, the judge pointed out that the Crown had been unable to prove conclusively that Cowle and Sproat had died of strychnine poisoning. "It does not convince me, nor does it convict the accused," he said.

On the third count, however, he had come to the "inescapable conclusion" that De Melker had murdered her son. This was evident because:

- Rhodes Cowle had died of arsenic poisoning
- The coffee flask held traces of arsenic
- The accused had put the arsenic into the flask
- The defence of suicide was untenable

When the judge finally turned to pass sentence on De Melker, her face went pale but she still proclaimed her innocence. De Melker was condemned to death by hanging. The sentence was carried out on the morning of 30 December 1932 at Pretoria Central Prison.

== Daisy de Melker in popular culture ==
- In 1934, Sarah Gertrude Millin wrote the novel Three Men Died, based on the de Melker case.
- In 1993, a television mini-series was made about Daisy de Melker, with Susan Coetzer in the title role.
- Ted Botha wrote the 2023 biography Daisy de Melker: Hiding among killers in the City of Gold.

== See also ==
- List of serial killers in South Africa
