= Melker Garay =

Swedish writer

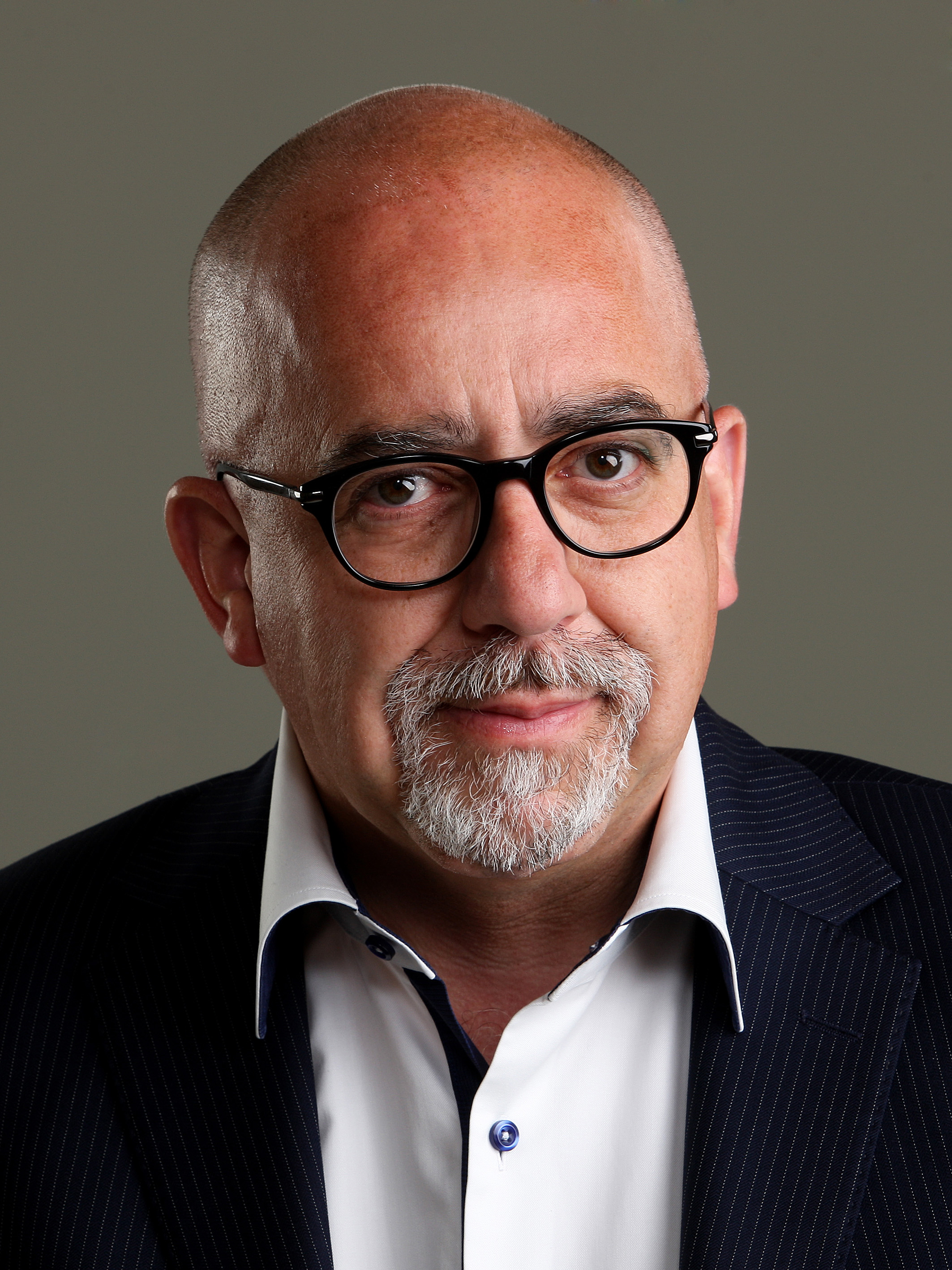
Melker Garay 2015

Melker Bent-Inge Garay (born 11 April 1966, in Tocopilla, Chile), is a Swedish author. Born to a Swedish father and Chilean mixed race mother, the family moved from Chile to Sweden in 1970, just prior to the Chilean Revolution in 1973. He was raised in Norrköping, on the east coast of Sweden, where he currently resides with his family.

His writing revolves around theological, existential and philosophical topics. Garay debuted in 2008 with his novel The Verger (published by Norlén & Slottner). The Verger has been translated into several languages.

In 2009, he became a member of the Swedish Writers' Union, and in 2012, he was elected as member of Svenska PEN, the Swedish link to the International PEN literary organisation. In 2014, Garay was elected to the Chilean Writers' Society.

Garay has pursued extensive university studies in both the Humanities and Social Sciences. While studying at Uppsala University, he was one of the founding members of the 'Sine qua non' society, a culturally oriented society which published a journal entitled Kaos (translation: Chaos).

== Bibliography ==
- Kyrkvaktmästarens hemliga anteckningar (2008)
- Josef Kinski och döden (2009)
- Inskriptioner i skymningen (2010)
- Dialogen (2011)
- Råttan och andra onda berättelser (2013)
- mcv (2014)
- Fågelskrämman - Skymningsnoveller (2015)
- En tindrande natthimmel (2016)

== Notes and references ==
- Melker Garay's website
- Melker Garay in Libris
