= Antonio Garay =

American football player (born 1979)

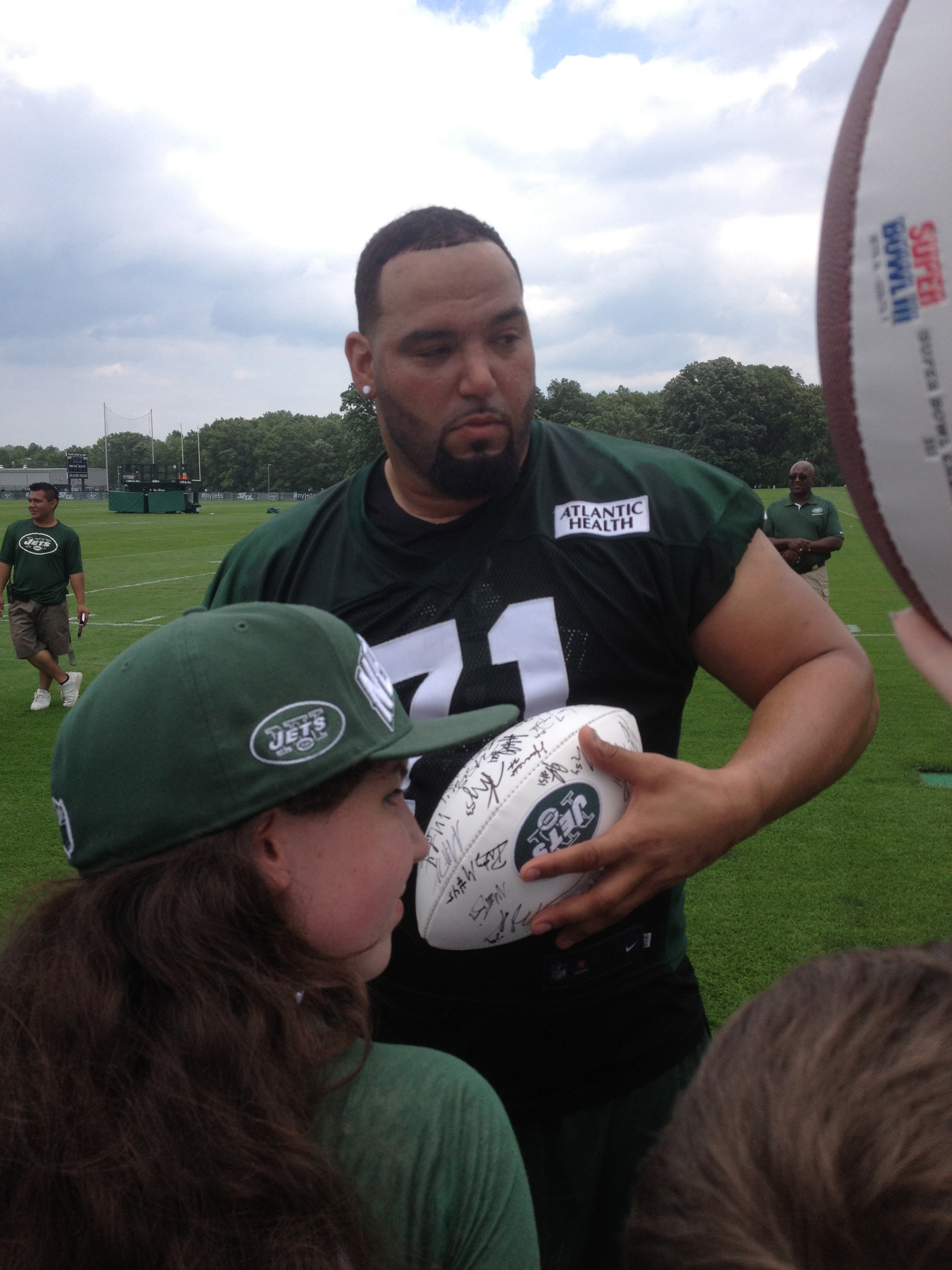
- Garay signing autographs at New York Jets minicamp in 2013

No. 95, 90, 71
- Position: Nose tackle

Personal information
- Born: November 30, 1979 (age 46); Rahway, New Jersey, U.S.
- Listed height: 6 ft 4 in (1.93 m)
- Listed weight: 320 lb (145 kg)

Career information
- High school: Rahway
- College: Boston College
- NFL draft: 2003: 6th round, 195th overall pick

Career history
- Cleveland Browns (2003–2004); Chicago Bears (2005–2007); New York Jets (2009)*; San Diego Chargers (2009–2012); New York Jets (2013)*
- * Offseason or practice squad member only

Career NFL statistics
- Total tackles: 138
- Sacks: 9
- Stats at Pro Football Reference

Antonio Garay Jr. (born November 30, 1979) is an American former professional football player who was a nose tackle in the National Football League (NFL). He was selected by the Cleveland Browns in the sixth round of the 2003 NFL draft. He played college football and wrestled for the Boston College Eagles. He was an NCAA wrestling All-American his sophomore year, placing 4th at the NCAA Championships while at Boston College.

Garay was also a member of the Chicago Bears, San Diego Chargers, and New York Jets.

He is notable for his outrageous hairstyles and for driving a Hello Kitty-themed smart car.

== Early life ==
Garay is Jewish. Garay's mother is Jewish and his father is a Catholic of Jamaican, Costa Rican, and Puerto Rican descent. He and his two siblings were exposed to both parents' faiths. He attended Rahway High School in Rahway, New Jersey, and was a standout offensive and defensive lineman. He was also the NJSIAA 275 lb (125 kg). state and national wrestling champion in 1998 and a high school All-American, winning the National High School Wrestling Tournament in Pittsburgh in 1998.

== College career ==
He played college football and wrestled at Boston College. He was an NCAA wrestling All-American his sophomore year, placing 4th at the NCAA Championships while at Boston College in 2000. During the 2000 season, he was also named the Most Outstanding Wrestler at the East Coast Wrestling Association tournament (ECWA) for the second year.

== Professional career ==
Pre-draft measurables
Height	Weight	Arm length	Hand span
6 ft 2 7/8 in (1.90 m)	295 lb (134 kg)	32 7/8 in (0.84 m)	9 1/2 in (0.24 m)
All values from NFL Combine

Garay spent two seasons with the Chicago Bears and was a member of the 2006 NFC Championship team. In a December 2007 game against the Washington Redskins, Garay was injured by an illegal block. He was placed on injured reserve for the remainder of the 2007 season. On March 8, 2008, the Chicago Bears announced that they would part ways with the defensive tackle, and he became an unrestricted free agent on February 29, 2008.

On October 20, 2009, the New York Jets announced that they had signed Garay to their practice squad.

Garay was signed off of the New York Jets' practice squad on December 9, 2009, by the San Diego Chargers. He was re-signed to a two-year deal on March 6, 2010. Garay was able to earn the starting job at nose tackle for the bulk of the 2010 season, and he finished 2010 with 48 tackles and 5.5 sacks, leading all San Diego defensive linemen in both categories.

Antonio Garay during the San Diego Chargers’ 33–28 victory over the Denver Broncos at Invesco Field at Mile High on January 2, 2011.

Garay was signed by the Jets on March 15, 2013. He was released on August 31, 2013.

== Personal life ==
Four of Garay's family members were athletes at Hofstra University: his father Tony and brother Daniel both played football and wrestled at Hofstra, his mother Marsha played softball and tennis at Hofstra, and his sister Francesca played volleyball there. His cousin Carlos Garay played in the Arena Football League.

== See also ==
- List of select Jewish football players
