= Tambo =

Tambo may refer to:

== People ==
- Adelaide Tambo (1929–2007), South African anti-apartheid activist
- Dali Tambo (born 1959), South African anti-apartheid activist, TV presenter and also son of Oliver Tambo and Adelaide Tambo
- Oliver Tambo (1917–1993), South African anti-apartheid activist
- Thembi Tambo, British-South African diplomat, politician and also daughter of Oliver Tambo and Adelaide Tambo

== Places ==
=== Australia ===
==== Queensland ====
- Tambo, Queensland, a locality in Blackall-Tambo Region
- Shire of Tambo (Queensland), a former local government area

==== Victoria ====
- Tambo River (Victoria)
- County of Tambo, Victoria
- Mount Tambo, Victoria
- Shire of Tambo (Victoria)

=== Peru ===
- Tambo River (Peru)
- Tambo District, Huaytará
- Tambo District, La Mar

=== Elsewhere ===
- Chungara–Tambo Quemado, border crossing between Bolivia and Chile
- Pizzo Tambò, a mountain in the Swiss Alps near the Splügen Pass
- Tambo de Oro, gold mine in Chile
- Tambo Island, in Pontevedra, Spain
- Tambo, Parañaque, in the Philippines

== Art, entertainment, and media ==
=== Fictional characters ===
- Tambo, a character in minstrel shows who plays tambourine
- Shelly Tambo, a fictional character in the US television series Northern Exposure

== Other ==
- Tambo (Incan structure), a building found along Incan roads
- Tambo (weapon), a very short staff used in martial arts

== See also ==
- El Tambo (disambiguation)
- OR Tambo (disambiguation), things named after Oliver Tambo
