= Ros de Lanerolle =

South African activist, journalist and publisher (1932–1993)

- Born: Jennifer Rosalynde Ainslie; 22 January 1932; Cape Town, South Africa
- Died: 23 September 1993 (aged 61); London, England, UK
- Education: University of Cape Town
- Occupations: Activist, feminist publisher
- Spouse: Accha de Lanerolle
- Children: 2, Indra and Ayisha

Ros de Lanerolle (22 January 1932 – 23 September 1993), also known as Rosalynde Ainslie, was a South African activist, journalist and publisher. Having settled in Britain in the 1950s, she campaigned actively against apartheid, and later became a pioneering figure in women's publishing in the UK, called by Florence Howe "the doyenne of feminist publishers".

== Life and career ==
Jennifer Rosalynde Ainslie was born in 1932 in Cape Town, where she went to school and attended the University of Cape Town, before moving to London, England, in 1954 as a graduate student of English literature. A radical socialist, she became increasingly involved with the politics of Southern Africa, and on a 1958 visit to Northern Rhodesia, hoping to meet South African trade unionists working there, she was taken into custody, declared undesirable, and deported.

She became London representative of the anti-apartheid quarterly journal Africa South, edited by Ronald Segal, and interacted closely with other South African exiles, including Ruth First, with whom she formed a close 20-year friendship. De Lanerolle was a member of the Boycott Movement (others included Peter Koinange, Claudia Jones and Steve Naidoo) founded in London on 26 June 1959, campaigning around the call by Albert Luthuli to boycott South African exports. In 1960 she was a prime initiator, together with Vella Pillay and Abdul Minty, of the Anti-Apartheid Movement (AAM) in Britain, and was its first secretary. She wrote two important pamphlets, published by AAM: Unholy Alliance (1961), analysing the support that the British military and business community and government gave to the white-minority Verwoerd regime (the pamphlet was launched at a press conference in London in 1962 by Irish writer and diplomat Conor Cruise O'Brien, who contributed the Introduction), and The Collaborators (with Dorothy Robinson, 1964), revealing the intricacies of the financial politics of apartheid.

=== Publishing career ===
In 1966, her book The Press in Africa: Communications Past and Present was published by Gollancz in London and Walker and Company in New York. She also did freelance editing work for Heinemann's African Writers Series, acknowledged by editorial director James Currey as the "most important single person at this time" in the South African network. She began working for Ernest Hecht's Souvenir Press in 1975, and in 1981 moved to the Women's Press (co-founded in 1977 by writer and publisher Stephanie Dowrick and entrepreneur Naim Attallah), where she was managing director and commissioning editor, publishing authors including Rosalie Bertell, Alice Walker, Ellen Kuzwayo, Joan Riley, Caesarina Makhoere, Emma Mashanini, Tsitsi Dangarembga, Ama Ata Aidoo, Merle Collins, Pauline Melville, Farida Karodia, and many others. As Helen Carr has observed: "The Women’s Press in Britain ... built up by Ros de Lanerolle, a South African who had earlier been much involved in opposition to apartheid, from the beginning had a policy of publishing work by black and what were then referred to as Third World writers."

De Lanerolle was a founder member of the Feminist Book Fair and helped found the organisation Women in Publishing (WiP), campaigning to improve the position of women in the book trade. In 1992, she was awarded WiP's Pandora Prize for her contribution "to raising the status of women in publishing".

De Lanerolle left The Women's Press in 1991 after nine years at the helm. She was already ill when in 1993 she made the second of two visits to South Africa since her name had been removed from the banned list; she was planning new publishing ventures that would be compensatory and beneficial to Black Africans, including Miriam Books in 1990, then, and had launched her new company, Open Letters, with Alison Hennegan and Gillian Hanscombe as co-directors. De Lanerolle was also a co-originator of the Orange Prize for Fiction by women. At the time of her premature death from cancer in 1993, aged 61, she was "at the height of her career as a feminist publisher". Neither Miriam Books (1990} nor Open Letters (1991) was able to attract financing to realise their founder's vision and survive.

== Personal life ==
In 1960, she married Sri Lanka-born Accha de Lanerolle, and they had two children: son Indra and daughter Ayisha.

== Selected writings ==
- (with Ronald Segal and Catherine Hoskyns) Political Africa: A Who's Who of Personalities and Parties (Stevens & Sons, 1961)
- The Unholy Alliance: Salazar, Verwoerd, Welensky; Introduction by Conor O'Brien, Foreword by Basil Davidson (London: Anti-Apartheid Movement, 1961)
- The Collaborators (with Dorothy Robinson; Anti-Apartheid Movement, 1964)
- The Press in Africa: Communications Past and Present (London: Gollancz; New York: Walker and Company, 1966)
- Masters and Serfs: Farm Labour in South Africa (International Defence & Aid Fund, 1973)
