= OR Tambo (disambiguation) =

Oliver Tambo (1917–1993), known as O.R., was a South African anti-apartheid politician and revolutionary.

OR Tambo may also refer to the following things named after him:

- O. R. Tambo International Airport, a major airport near Johannesburg
- OR Tambo District Municipality, a district of Eastern Cape province
- OR Tambo Cosmos, a soccer club based in Mthatha, Eastern Cape
- O. R. Tambo Recreation Ground, a park in London

== See also ==
- Tambo (disambiguation)
