= Sue Butterworth =

British bookseller (1950–2004)

- Born: 10 September 1950; Llandudno, Wales, UK
- Died: 26 July 2004 (aged 53); Bank, Hampshire, UK
- Education: Penrhos College
- Occupations: Bookseller, businesswoman, editor, activist
- Known for: Co-founder of Silver Moon Bookshop

Susan Ann Butterworth (10 September 1950 – 26 July 2004) was a British bookseller and activist, co-founder of Silver Moon Bookshop in 1984, and editor of the store's newsletter, Silver Moon Quarterly.

== Early life ==
Sue Butterworth was born in Llandudno in north Wales, the daughter of F. Buttersworth and Doris Buttersworth. Her father had a furniture store. She attended Penrhos College until the age of 16. In 1973, she and a friend made a driving tour of South Africa.

== Career ==
Butterworth began working in publishing as a secretary, then as an editorial assistant at Book Club Associates from 1977 to 1981. She was a member of Women in Publishing from its launch in 1979. In 1982, she and Jane Cholmeley began creating Silver Moon Bookshop, which opened in 1984 in Charing Cross Road, and Silver Moon Books, a publishing company. They only stocked books by women; they worked with publisher Barbara Grier of Naiad Press to bring more American lesbian-themed works to the British audience. The shop was a community hub for feminists in London, and Butterworth's newsletter, the Silver Moon Quarterly, had more than 10,000 subscribers worldwide.

After Silver Moon closed in 2001, due to rent increases, Butterworth taught, chaired the Society of Bookmen from 2002 to 2003, and was vice-chair of the Book Trade Benevolent Society. She and Corinne Gotch founded Meerkat Books, a not-for-profit marketing network to promote independent British booksellers and publishers.

Butterworth and Cholmeley won the Pandora Award from Women in Publishing in 1989, and the Mike Rhodes Trust Award in 2001. In 1996, Butterworth served as a judge for the NCR Non-Fiction Prize, on a panel with Nick Hornby, Jeremy Paxman, Cristina Odone, and Andrew Roberts.

== Personal life ==
Butterworth died at Bank, Hampshire, in 2004, aged 53 years, from cancer; she was survived by her partner Irene Roele. The British Book Industry Awards include a Sue Butterworth Award for Young Bookseller of the Year, named in her memory and sponsored by HarperCollins.
