= Anti-apartheid =

Anti-apartheid may refer to any opposition to apartheid, the 1948–94 racial policy of the South African government; in particular:

- Internal resistance to apartheid, within South Africa
- Anti-Apartheid Movement, an organisation founded in Britain

== See also ==
- Category:Opposition to apartheid in South Africa
- Category:South West African anti-apartheid activists
