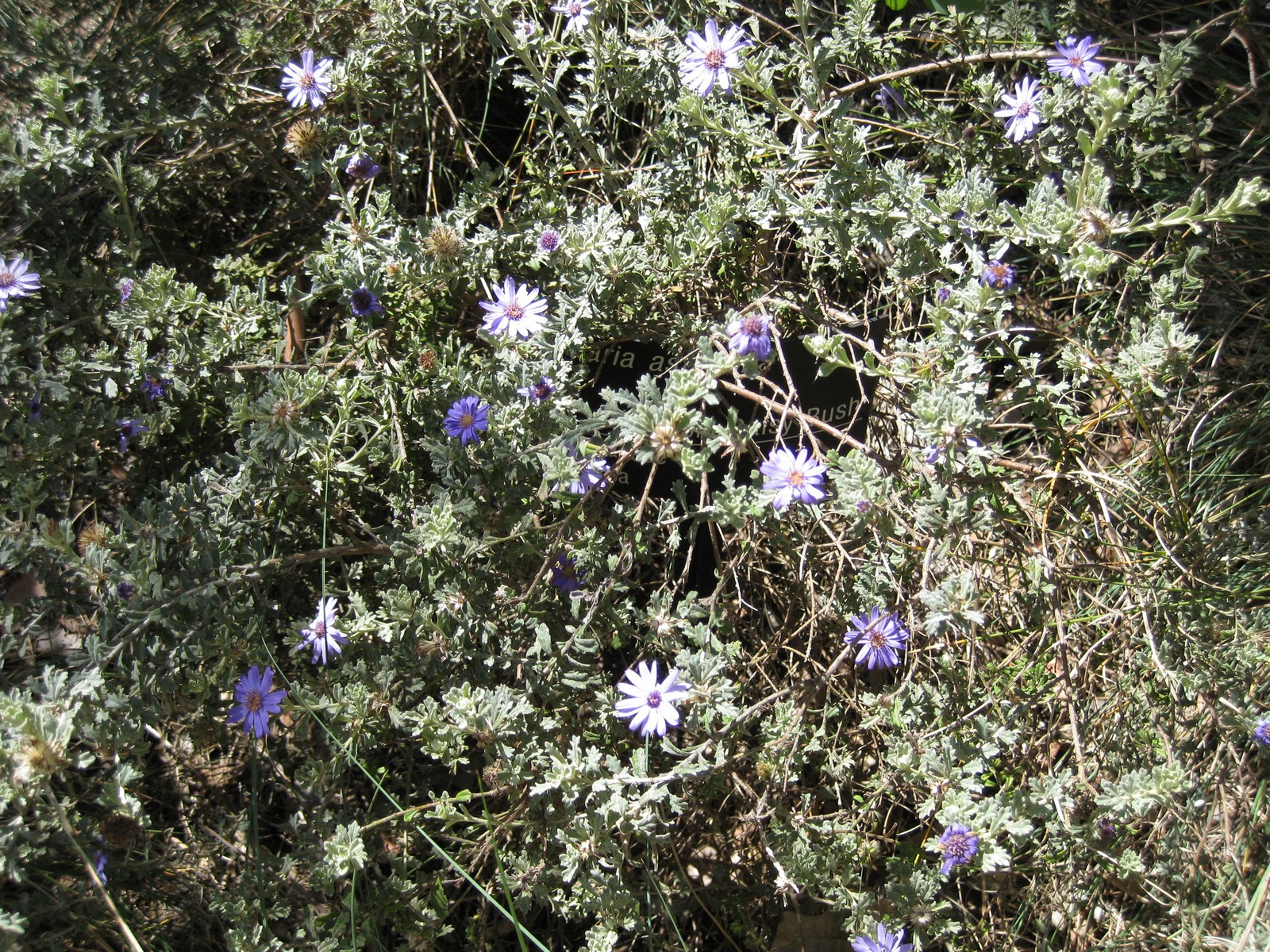
- Olearia astroloba

Conservation status
- Vulnerable (EPBC Act)

Scientific classification
- Kingdom: Plantae
- Clade: Tracheophytes
- Clade: Angiosperms
- Clade: Eudicots
- Clade: Asterids
- Order: Asterales
- Family: Asteraceae
- Genus: Olearia
- Species: O. astroloba

Binomial name
- Olearia astroloba Lander & N.G.Walsh

Synonyms
- Olearia sp. (Nunniong); Olearia sp. 3 (NE of Mt Simpson)

= Olearia astroloba =

Marble daisy-bush

Species of shrub

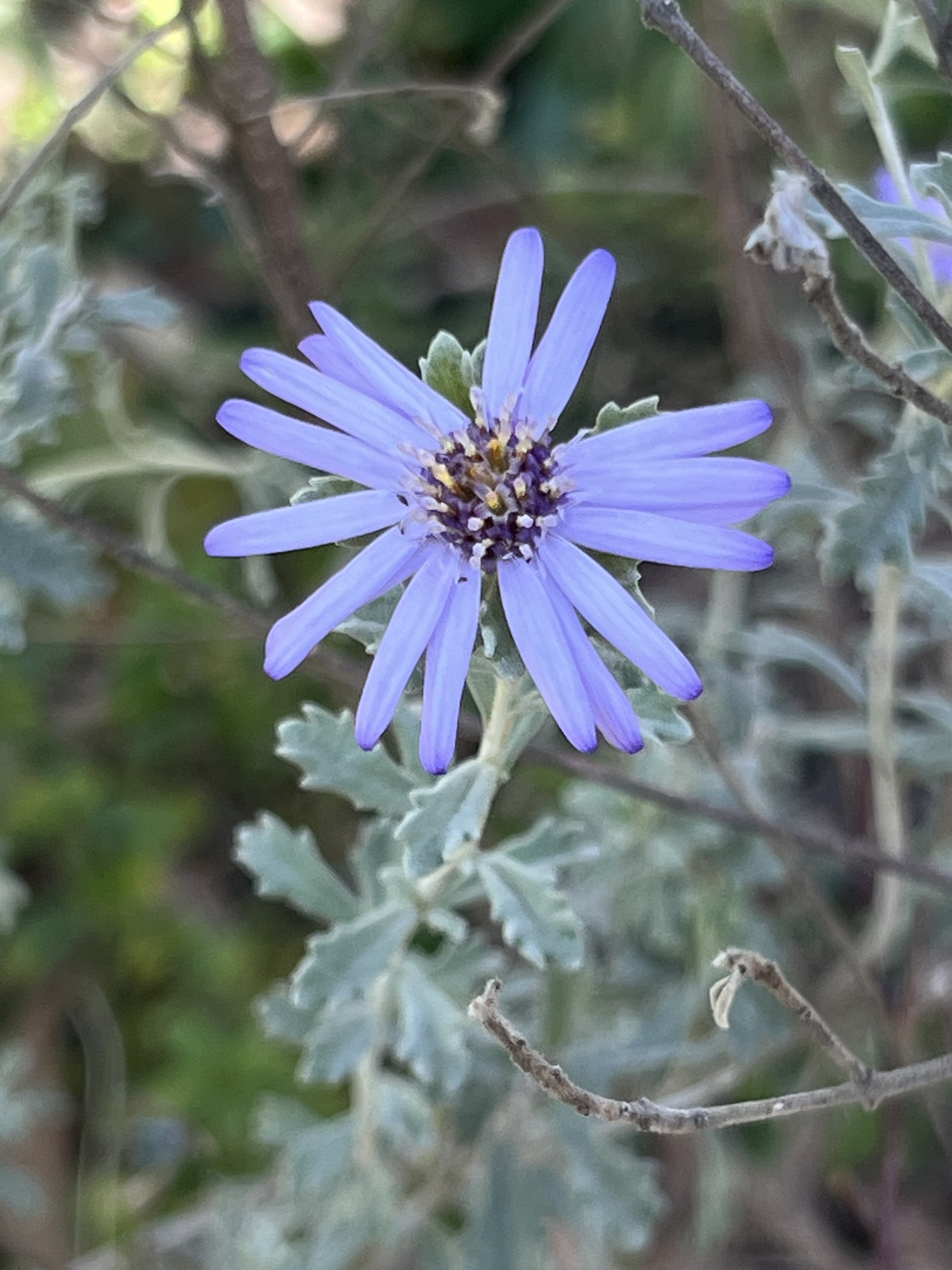
Flower detail

Olearia astroloba, commonly known as marble daisy-bush, is a species of flowering plant in the family Asteraceae and is endemic to a restricted area of Victoria in Australia. It is a greyish shrub with sessile, spatula-shaped leaves and mauve or violet and purple, daisy-like inflorescences.

== Description ==
Olearia astroloba is a shrub that typically grows to a height of up to about 0.5 m (1 ft 8 in) and has more or less sessile, greyish-green, spatula-shaped leaves 5–18 mm (0.20–0.71 in) long and 3–10 mm (0.12–0.39 in) wide, often with teeth or shallow lobes near the tip. The lower surface of the leaves is densely covered with woolly, star-shaped hairs. The heads are arranged on the ends of branchlets and are 15–35 mm (0.59–1.38 in) in diameter and sessile, with an involucre 5.5–7.5 mm (0.22–0.30 in) in diameter at the base. Each head or daisy-like "flower" has 12 to 24 ray florets, the mauve or violet, petal-like ligule 7–14 mm (0.28–0.55 in) long, surrounding 12 to 45 purple disc florets. Flowering occurs between June and July although flowers continue to appear until March and the fruit is a dark purplish achene, the pappus bristles 4–5 mm (0.16–0.20 in) long.

== Taxonomy ==
Olearia astroloba was first formally described in 1989 by Nicholas Sean Lander and Neville Grant Walsh in the journal Muelleria based on plant material collected from Marble Gully in 1988. The specific epithet (astroloba) means "star-shaped lobes", referring to the hairs on the disc florets.

== Distribution and habitat ==
Marble daisy-bush is restricted to Marble Gully, near Mount Tambo in East Gippsland, Victoria. It grows on skeletal soils on steep north-facing slopes at an altitude of about 600 m (2,000 ft) near the headwaters of the Tambo River. Associated plant species are Allocasuarina verticillata, Eucalyptus nortonii, Pomaderris oraria subsp. calcicola, Ozothamnus adnatus and Themeda triandra.

== Conservation ==
Olearia astroloba is listed as "vulnerable" under the Australian Government Environment Protection and Biodiversity Conservation Act 1999 and as "threatened" under the Victorian Government Flora and Fauna Guarantee Act 1988. The total population is estimated to be 1,030 plants within a 40 hectare area. Potential threats include inappropriate fire regimes, weed invasion, grazing by stock and rabbits and mining for marble.

== Use in horticulture ==
The species prefer a well-drained position in full sun or part shade. It is able to withstand drought and moderate frost. Pruning promotes new growth and increased flowering. Propagation is by cuttings or seed, though a large percentage of the latter is often non-viable.
