= Adelaide Tambo =

South African anti-apartheid activist and political exile

- Born: Adelaide Frances Tshukudu; 18 July 1929; Top Location, Vereeniging, Union of South Africa
- Died: 31 January 2007 (aged 77); Johannesburg, South Africa
- Occupations: Anti-apartheid activist, politician
- Political party: ANC
- Spouse: Oliver Tambo (m. 1956; died 1993)
- Children: 3 including Dali and Thembi

Adelaide Frances Tambo (née Tshukudu; 18 July 1929 – 31 January 2007) was a South African anti-apartheid activist and former political exile.

She was involved in South African politics for five decades and was married to Oliver Tambo, president of the African National Congress (ANC), from 1967 to 1991. She was well-known for her role in the struggle against apartheid.

== Early career ==
Born on 18 July 1929 in Top Location as Adelaide Frances Tshukudu, she was affectionately known as Mama Tambo in South Africa. At the age of 10, following a raid by the police on a riot in Top Location where a police officer was killed, Adelaide's ailing grandfather, aged 82, was among those arrested and taken to the town square. Her grandfather collapsed and she had to sit with him until he regained consciousness. After the incident, she vowed to fight the police till the end. She attended the St Thomas Practising School in Johannesburg and Orlando High in Soweto.

Tambo started working as a nurse at the Chris Hani Baragwanath Hospital. In 1944, she worked as a courier for the ANC. She joined the ANC Youth League at 18, which she was tasked to open branches in Transvaal and elected chairperson of the George Goch branch. She left the country along with her husband Oliver Tambo in 1960 and worked as a courier for him. She was also one of the founding members of Afro-Asian Solidarity Movement and Pan African Women's Organization (PAWO) in 1963.

== Political career ==
Following the end of apartheid, Tambo served as a member of parliament from 1994 to 1999.

Tambo received the Order of the Baobab in Gold, one of the highest honours bestowed by the post-1994 South African government. The South African Anglican Church awarded her the Order of Simon of Cyrene, the highest award given to laypeople for distinguished service.

== Personal life and death ==
Tambo was married to Oliver Tambo in December 1956 during the Treason Trial and the couple had three children; their son Dali is a television talk-show personality.

Tambo died on 31 January 2007, aged 77, at her home in Johannesburg from undisclosed causes. She was buried next to her husband in her home town of Wattville on 10 February 2007. The service was held in a stadium and led by Anglican Archbishop Njongonkulu Ndungane. Among the thousands of mourners were presidents Thabo Mbeki and Nelson Mandela.
