= Hanef Bhamjee =

South African–British anti-apartheid activist (1946–2022)

Mohamed Hanef Bhamjee (1 December 1946 – 8 January 2022), known as Hanef Bhamjee, was a South African–British campaigner and organiser in the British Anti-Apartheid Movement and Secretary of the Wales Anti-Apartheid Movement from 1981 to 1994.

== Early life in South Africa ==
Bhamjee was born on 1 December 1946 in Wolmaransstad in South Africa's former Transvaal Province. His brother, Yusuf Bhamjee, was also an activist and politician. Schooled in Pietermaritzburg, Bhamjee was involved in anti-apartheid youth politics and the Natal Indian Congress. As a high school student, he was recruited to become the youngest member of a Pietermaritzburg-based political study group that also included Harry Gwala and other stalwarts of the African National Congress. He left for the United Kingdom in 1965, aged 18, to avoid persecution.

== Life in Britain ==
Bhamjee came to Wales in 1972, where the Anti-Apartheid Movement was already active in Cardiff, Newport and Swansea. The Wales Anti-apartheid Movement (WAAM) was founded in 1981 and Bhamjee was the Secretary until its dissolution in 1994. He succeeded in growing the movement to a network of 22 branches across Wales. Bhamjee's house in Cardiff acted as the office for the movement in Wales, though he was subjected to attacks, with his car being damaged and Bhamjee himself being beaten up by thugs. The network was able to mobilise demonstrations of several hundred at short notice, to protest against touring South African rugby teams.

The assets of the WAAM were transferred to Action for Southern Africa (ACTSA) Wales. Bhamjee became Secretary of ACTSA Wales and the Wales Anti-Racist Alliance.

He was awarded the Order of the British Empire in the 2003 Birthday Honours, for "services to Race Relations, the Wales Anti-Apartheid Movement and the charity and voluntary sector". In 2009 Bhamjee returned to South Africa to be presented with a Mahatma Gandhi Award for reconciliation and peace.

In 2013, Bhamjee was commissioned to write a book about the role of Wales in the fight against Apartheid. WAAM: A History of the Wales Anti-Apartheid Movement was published in 2016 by Seren Books.

Bhamjee worked as a solicitor in Cardiff. He died on 8 January 2022.
