= Yusuf Bhamjee =

South African politician and activist

Executive Mayor of uMgungundlovu District Municipality
- In office 23 April 2008 – August 2016
- Preceded by: Bongi Sithole-Moloi
- Succeeded by: Thobekile Maphumulo

Member of the KwaZulu-Natal Legislature
- In office 4 October 2016 – 7 May 2019
- In office August 2007 – March 2008
- In office May 1994 – April 2004

Member of the National Assembly
- In office 23 April 2004 – 10 August 2007
- Constituency: KwaZulu-Natal

Personal details
- Born: Yusuf Suleman Bhamjee; 10 January 1950 Wolmaransstad, Transvaal; Union of South Africa
- Died: 3 January 2025 (aged 74) Pietermaritzburg, KwaZulu-Natal, South Africa
- Resting place: Mountain Rise Cemetery; Pietermaritzburg, South Africa
- Party: African National Congress
- Spouse: Sabera Bhamjee (m. 1977; died 2006)
- Relations: Hanef Bhamjee (brother)
- Children: 3

Yusuf Suleman Bhamjee (10 January 1950 – 3 January 2025) was a South African politician, academic, and anti-apartheid activist who represented the African National Congress (ANC) in the KwaZulu-Natal Legislature from 1994 until 2004 and then the National Assembly between 2004 and 2007 when he returned to the provincial legislature. He resigned from the provincial legislature in 2008 to become the Mayor of the uMgungundlovu District Municipality in KwaZulu-Natal, a position he would hold until 2016. Bhamjee then briefly served as the speaker of the district municipality before returning to the provincial legislature where he served until his retirement from politics in 2019.

== Early life and career ==
Bhamjee was born on 10 January 1950 in Wolmaransstad in the former Transvaal. His elder brother was activist Hanef Bhamjee. While attending high school in Natal Province, Bhamjee was an accomplished sportsman, matching the South African 100-metre sprint record at the national athletics championships. He later played cricket as a bowler and batsman for Natal, and he was a member and later coach of Young Natalians FC.

After attending university in Dublin, Ireland, Bhamjee became a politics lecturer at the University of Natal. During the same period, he was active in the anti-apartheid movement through the Natal Indian Congress and United Democratic Front; he was particularly active in campaigning for sports boycotts of South Africa. In 2019, Andrew Mlangeni awarded him the Andrew Mlangeni Green Jacket for his contribution to non-racial sport.

== Legislative career: 1994–2007 ==
In South Africa's first post-apartheid elections in 1994, Bhamjee was elected to represent the ANC in the KwaZulu-Natal Legislature. Later the same year, he was the only Indian to win election to the Provincial Executive Committee of the KwaZulu-Natal ANC. He was elected to a second term in the legislature in the 1999 general election.

In the 2004 general election, Bhamjee was elected to an ANC seat in the KwaZulu-Natal caucus of the National Assembly. However, midway through the term, on 10 August 2007, he resigned from his seat and returned to the KwaZulu-Natal Legislature; his seat in the National Assembly was filled by Ntombikayise Sibhidla.

== Mayor of uMgungundlovu: 2008–2016 ==
On 23 April 2008, Bhamjee was elected as mayor of uMgungundlovu District Municipality, with Tu Zondi as his deputy. His election followed the ousting of Bongi Sithole, whom the ANC removed in a vote of no confidence due to allegations of mismanagement and maladministration. Bhamjee was retained in the mayoral office after the 2011 local elections. In addition, he was co-opted onto the ANC Provincial Executive Committee in 2012.

As the end of his second mayoral term approached, the ANC announced that Bhamjee would not stand for another term as mayor. After the 2016 local elections, he was succeeded as mayor by the ANC's Thobekile Maphumulo but was re-elected to the council and was elected as its speaker.

== Final legislative stint: 2016–2019 ==
Less than two months after he was elected council speaker, Bhamjee was sworn into the KwaZulu-Natal Legislature in early-October 2016. He was not placed on the ANC's candidate list for the legislature for the 2019 provincial election.

== Personal life ==
Bhamjee married Sabera Bhamjee in 1977 after seven years of courtship. They had two daughters, Suhayfa and Sameera. Sabera was the only woman gynaecologist in Pietermaritzburg at the time of her death.

Sabera died on 2 June 2006 in her consulting room at St Anne's Hospital after being stabbed more than 60 times in her neck, head, and chest. There were no witnesses and no forensic evidence and the motive for the killing was unclear. As of 2017, the police had not found any leads in the murder investigation.

Bhamjee died on 3 January 2025, and was buried at the Mountain Rise Cemetery outside Pietermaritzburg later that day as per Islamic rites.
