= Vella Pillay =

Economist and anti-apartheid activist (1923–2004)

- Born: 8 October 1923; Johannesburg, South Africa
- Died: 29 July 2004 (aged 80); Highgate, London, United Kingdom
- Occupation: Economist
- Known for: Anti-apartheid activism
- Spouse: Patricia (Patsy) Truebig (m. 1948)
- Children: 2 (including Anand Pillay)

Vella Pillay (8 October 1923 – 29 July 2004) was a South African international economist and a founding member of the British Anti-Apartheid Movement. He was a member of the South African Communist Party and coordinated the party's overseas activities from London when it was banned by the South African government. As a chairman of the editorial committee of Anti-Apartheid News, he wrote extensively on the South African economy under the apartheid regime.

Pillay studied at the University of the Witwatersrand before receiving graduate degrees from the London School of Economics and University of London. He returned to South Africa in 1992 before the first non-racial elections in 1994 and coordinated with other economists as a part of the African National Congress's (ANC) Macroeconomics (MERG) to produce a forward looking framework for South Africa's macroeconomic policies. The report, Making Democracy Work: A Framework for Macroeconomic Policy in South Africa (1993), however, was rejected by the African National Congress.

== Early life and education ==
Vella Pillay was born on 8 October 1923 in Johannesburg into a family with six children and a low income. Pillay was of Tamil descent and later classified as an Indian by the South African Population Registration Act, 1950. In his early childhood, he went to a racially segregated school that was designated for Indians and Coloureds. During this time, he would help his mother sell vegetables to meet their financial needs. In 1948, Pillay was awarded a bachelor of commerce degree from the University of the Witwatersrand. He was enrolled as a part-time student while working as a bookkeeper for an Indian company.

He moved to London in 1949 and enrolled in the London School of Economics (LSE) for an international economics honors degree. During this time, he worked with Bank of China as a research officer. While studying part-time at the LSE, Pillay relied on his wife for financial support. At the LSE, Pillay was supervised by James Meade, a Nobel laureate who had been a director at the Cabinet Office Economic Section and a contributor to Keynes' General Theory of Employment. He visited the People's Republic of China several times and met Mao Zedong, Zhou Enlai and other leaders.

== Activism ==
During Pillay's time at the University of the Witwatersrand, he was a member of the Progressive Students Federation and was a participant in the Transvaal Indian Congress. Early on, he led a protest of municipal tenants to the Johannesburg City Council, when their water supply was disconnected because of their inability to pay the required fees. His protest resulted in the restoration of the water supply to the municipal tenants. He was a member of the South African Communist Party (SACP) and became involved with the leadership of the South African Indian Congress. At the SACP he met influential African leaders including Nelson Mandela, Walter Sisulu, Oliver Tambo and the then President of the African National Congress, Alfred Bitini Xuma. During the 1940s Pillay joined the resistance to the Pegging Act of 1943, later to be incorporated in apartheid legislation, which included the Group Areas Act that discriminated against Indians. He campaigned against the act, which limited the ability of Indians to hold residence and own property outside of designated regions, and led a protest against the South African pass laws that restricted movement of black and coloured South Africans.

Operating out of London, Pillay was involved in the South African Communist Party's overseas operations, even after the South African government banned the SACP in 1950. He was the fund manager of the party, and a part of the team that produced the party's periodical, African Communist. He supervised arrangements for the party's operatives to receive military training in China and the Soviet Union. During this time, Pillay's house in North London was also a place for students and other South Africans moving to Britain to meet and discuss the applicability of Marxist ideas to the freedom struggle in South Africa. As a result of the Sino-Soviet split in the 1960s, Pillay's position at the Bank of China was viewed with suspicion by the SACP, which remained loyal to the Soviet Communist Party. In 1960 or 1961, Pillay was confronted by a representative of the SACP (possibly Michael Alan Harmel (1915–1974), a political mentor and friend of Mandela) on a boat on a river in Moscow and told to leave the Bank of China or face expulsion from the SACP. Pillay refused and was side-lined by the SACP. He had declined an offer of an equivalent position at a proposed Soviet bank thinking his job with the Chinese was more secure.

In 1960, Pillay was the founding member of the British Anti-Apartheid Movement, after organising a boycott of South African goods in 1959, and worked closely with the British Communist Party. He served in several roles within the organisation up until 1994. He was the organisation's vice-chairman between 1980 and 1986, and had served as the treasurer of the organisation. As the chairman of the editorial committee of the Anti-Apartheid News, he wrote extensively on the economy under the apartheid regime, labour and trade policies, and operations of the South African administration. In 1978, Pillay was awarded an MSc in economics by the University of London. During his time in London, Pillay published widely on South African economics, and often used the pseudonym "P. Tlale" when writing for the African Communist.

== Economic research and advisory ==
Pillay was inducted into the Greater London Enterprise Board of Ken Livingstone's Greater London Council (GLC) in 1981. The board was tasked with driving investments from GLC into the local economy, and drive employment and opportunities for minorities including black people. He served as an assistant general manager with the Bank of China between 1978 and his retirement in 1988. During this time he contributed to the bank's international finance including the managing of China's foreign exchange reserves. He was the bank's economic adviser and continued to serve in a part time capacity after his retirement until 2002.

Pillay returned to Johannesburg in 1992 before the first non-racial elections in 1994, to coordinate the work amongst multiple economists as a part of the African National Congress's (ANC) Macroeconomic Research Group (MERG). As a part of the group's report in December 1993, Making Democracy Work: A Framework for Macroeconomic Policy in South Africa, the group recommended social and economic liberation in an attempt to boost living conditions within the country. However, the MERG report was rejected by the ANC's Department of Economic Planning (DEP), and the government focused on investments into large-scale housebuilding programs. Pillay had secured a foreword to the report by Mandela, however, the report was vetoed by the DEP. Pillay received an honorary doctorate, for his contributions with the MERG, from the University of Natal in 1995.

On the occasion of Pillay's 80th birthday President Thabo Mbeki sent him a message which, in part, read "your outstanding contribution to the liberation of our people will always be remembered with fondness – particularly your role in establishing one of the greatest solidarity movements of our time, the British Anti-Apartheid Movement".

== Personal life ==
Pillay married Patricia (Patsy) Truebig (1925 – 2021) in June 1948. Truebig was of Austro-German descent. He had met her earlier during his time with the SACP. The couple married in Mahikeng in the Cape, where marriage was permitted across races at the time. The couple had two sons including mathematician Anand Pillay. During their early years in London in the 1950s, when Pillay was enrolled in the London School of Economics, Patsy supported the family while working at the Indian High Commission in London working for V. K. Krishna Menon, Indian civil servant and aide to the first Prime Minister of India, Jawaharlal Nehru.

Pillay died on 29 July 2004 at Whittington Hospital, in Highgate, London, at the age of 80.

== Bibliography ==
- Gurney, Christabel (2000). "'A Great Cause': The Origins of the Anti-Apartheid Movement, June 1959-March 1960". Journal of Southern African Studies. 26 (1): 123–144. doi:10.1080/030570700108414. ISSN 0305-7070. JSTOR 2637553. S2CID 145197743.
- Macroeconomic Research Group (1993). Making democracy work : a framework for macroeconomic policy in South Africa : a report to members of the Democratic Movement of South Africa. University of the Western Cape, Centre for Development Studies. ISBN 1-86808-183-4. OCLC 924537939.
- Padayachee, Vishnu (2019). Shadow of Liberation : Contestation and Compromise in the Economic and Social Policy of the African National Congress, 1943-1996. Johannesburg: Witwatersrand University Press. ISBN 978-1-77614-395-5. OCLC 1122459265.
- Padayachee, Vishnu; Sender, John (2018). "Vella Pillay: Revolutionary Activism and Economic Policy Analysis". Journal of Southern African Studies. 44 (1): 149–165. doi:10.1080/03057070.2018.1405644. ISSN 0305-7070. S2CID 148592403.
