= Judy Piatkus =

British publisher

Judy Piatkus is a British publisher, entrepreneur and author who founded Piatkus Books in 1979.

== Career ==
Piatkus founded Piatkus Books from the bedroom of her home in Loughton, Essex, in 1979. The publishing house published authors Nora Roberts, Danielle Steel, and Virginia Andrews and grew to be a successful romance publisher in the UK, and a pioneer in publishing books on personal development and lifestyle.

Piatkus published a wide range of titles, from cookbooks by Mary Berry to fiction by Nora Roberts. Piatkus Books became known in the area of personal growth and lifestyle when it published mindfulness titles by Jon Kabat-Zinn, alongside business books such as David Allen's Getting Things Done. Piatkus explored a wide range of subjects such as feng shui, spirituality, alternative health, the mind-body connection, detoxing, and other topics that were relatively unknown in the UK at that time. Many leaders in their fields of expertise such as Seth Godin and Dr Irvin Yalom were on the Piatkus list. As a publisher, Judy Piatkus was regarded as a risk-taker within the publishing industry, being described as "never afraid to take a chance on an unknown whose work she believed in."

In 2007, Piatkus completed a successful exit sale to Little, Brown, who have continued to publish books under the Piatkus imprint.

In April 2021, Piatkus published her first book, Ahead of Her Time, a memoir and story of female entrepreneurship, values-led management, and the rise of personal development publishing.

=== Recognition ===
In December 2005, Piatkus was awarded the Women in Publishing Pandora Award. In February 2009, she received a lifetime achievement award from the Romantic Novelists' Association.

Ahead of Her Time was the winner of a 2022 UK Business Book Award in the Business Journey category. It was also selected by Soul and Spirit Magazine as the Most Empowering Book of 2021.
