= Anita Miller (publisher) =

American author and publisher (1926–2018)

- Born: Anita Rochelle Wolfberg; August 31, 1926 Chicago, Illinois, U.S.
- Died: August 4, 2018 (aged 91)
- Occupation: Author, publisher
- Education: Roosevelt University; Northwestern University (PhD)
- Spouse: Jordan Miller (m. 1948)
- Children: 3, including Mark Crispin Miller

Anita Miller (née Wolfberg; August 31, 1926 – August 4, 2018) was an American author and co-founder of the publishing house Academy Chicago Publishers. She founded the company with her husband Jordan despite having no prior publishing experience.

Academy Chicago's six-year legal battle with Mary Cheever, the widow of John Cheever, over a contract to publish up to 68 of Cheever's previously uncollected stories, resulted in the publication of Fall River and Other Uncollected Stories in 1994 and led Miller to write Uncollecting Cheever: The Family of John Cheever vs. Academy Chicago Publishers, which was published by Rowman & Littlefield in 1998. The Millers lost in court, but were supported by the Association of American Publishers and the Association of American University Presses, who protested the decision.

Miller stated that one of the purposes of Academy Chicago was to "bring back books by women that have been unfairly neglected and gone out of print." She published Indiana, the first novel by George Sand, and The Homemaker, a 1924 novel by Dorothy Canfield Fisher that Miller called "way ahead of its time." Miller was the winner of the Pandora Award from the London chapter of Women in Publishing in 1996.

== Personal life ==
Miller was born Anita Rochelle Wolfberg in Chicago's West Side. She received her undergraduate degree from Roosevelt University, where she met her husband Jordan Miller whom she married in 1948. She also held a Ph.D. in English literature from Northwestern University. They had three sons: Bruce Joshua Miller, Mark Crispin Miller, and Eric Lincoln Miller. The Millers lived in Chicago.

== Bibliography ==
- The equal rights amendment: a bibliographic study (1976)
- ARNOLD BENNETT An Annotated Bibliography 1887-1932 (1977)
- Uncollecting Cheever: The Family of John Cheever vs. Academy Chicago (1998)
- Sharon: Israel's Warrior-Politician (2002)
- Four Classic Ghostly Tales (2005)
- What Went Wrong in Ohio: The Conyers Report on the 2004 Presidential Election (2005)
- George W. Bush Versus the U.S. Constitution: The Downing Street Memos and Deception, Manipulation, Torture, Retribution, Coverups in the Iraq War and Illegal Domestic Spying (Editor, 2006)
- The Complete Transcripts of the Clarence Thomas - Anita Hill Hearings: October 11, 12, 13, 1991 (Editor, 2014)
- Tea & Antipathy: An American Family in Swinging London (2015)
