= El Tambo =

El Tambo may refer to:

- El Tambo, Cauca, Colombia
- El Tambo, Nariño, Colombia
- El Tambo Canton, Ecuador
- El Tambo, Chile, city in the O'Higgins Region
- El Tambo District, Huancayo province, Peru
- Tambo District, La Mar, Peru

== See also ==
- Tambo (disambiguation)
