= Dali Tambo =

South African media personality (born 1959)

- Born: 1 March 1959 (age 67)
- Education: Lancing College
- Alma mater: American University in Paris; Sorbonne University
- Known for: Anti-apartheid activist, TV presenter
- Spouse: Rachael Tambo
- Children: 4
- Parent(s): Oliver Tambo; Adelaide Tambo
- Family: Nomatemba Tambo

Dali Tambo (born 1 March 1959) is a South African media personality best known as the presenter of the SABC television talk-show People of the South and as the founder of the anti-apartheid organisation Artists Against Apartheid.

== Early life ==
Dali Tambo is the son of Oliver Tambo, former president of the African National Congress, and Adelaide Tambo. Tambo attended Lancing College in West Sussex, United Kingdom, before going on to study at the American University and the Sorbonne in Paris, France, where he acquired a bachelor's degree in International Affairs and Political Science.

Dali Tambo is married to Rachael Tambo and they have four children; their oldest son is named after his father (O. R. Tambo).

== Artists Against Apartheid ==
In 1983, Dali Tambo founded the anti-apartheid organisation Artists Against Apartheid with musician Jerry Dammers. The organisation organised numerous anti-apartheid concerts in Europe during the 1980s. Tambo returned to South Africa in 1991 as apartheid ended.

== People of the South ==
Tambo hosted the talk show People of the South on SABC from 1994 to 2002 and again from 2012 to 2013.

=== Mugabe interview ===
On 2 June 2013, People of the South aired an interview Tambo did with the President of Zimbabwe Robert Mugabe only two months before the 2013 Zimbabwean general election. It reportedly took Tambo three years to organise the interview with the Mugabe family. The interview generated some controversy and was criticised for being "sycophantic" by the Mail & Guardian newspaper, and called a "public relations exercise" for Mugabe by CapeTalk567 radio presenter Kieno Kammies. In the heated interview with Kammies on CapeTalk567, Tambo replied that "People of the South [is] not Hard Talk" and that the show's laid-back non-confrontational style would be at odds with challenging Mugabe on the allegations of human rights abuses, election fraud, and the controversial land reform programme that Mugabe led.

== Sculpture park ==
Since leaving People of the South in 2013, Tambo has focused his attention on promoting the idea of a commemorative sculpture park in the city of Tshwane. The planned park will feature 400 to 500 life-size bronze statues of highly-regarded anti-apartheid activists.

== Statues ==
Through his company Koketso Growth, Tambo obtained tenders to make statues. One such example is the Statue of Nelson Mandela on the balcony of Cape Town City Hall. Tambo commissioned Barry Jacksen and Xhanti Mpakama to do the work, which was unveiled on 24 July 2018.

== Controversies ==
Dali Tambo owes SARS more than R1.7 million of unpaid personal tax.
