= Rydal Penrhos =

Rydal Penrhos School

Location
- Pwllycrochan Avenue; Colwyn Bay, Conwy, LL29 7BT; Wales

Information
- Type: Private day school
- Motto: Veritas Scientia Fides (Truth, Knowledge, Faith)
- Religious affiliation: Methodist
- Established: 1880 (Penrhos) and 1885 (Rydal Mount); 1999 (mergers)
- Founder: Frederick Payne (Penrhos); Thomas Osborn (Rydal Mount)
- Department for Education URN: 401972 Tables
- Chair: Deborah McKinnel
- Principal: Tom Hutchinson
- Chaplain: Reverend Rob Beamish
- Gender: Co-educational
- Age: 2 to 18
- Enrolment: 325
- Houses: Morgan; Osborn; Payne; Wesley
- Colours: Black, amber & cyan
- Alumni: Old Rydalians
- Website: www.rydalpenrhos.com

Rydal Penrhos School is a private day school in Colwyn Bay, North Wales. It is the only Methodist school in the independent sector in Wales. It is located on multiple sites around the town with a site in the neighbouring village of Rhos-on-Sea where it keeps its watersports equipment for easy access to the beach.

== History ==
The school started life as five separate institutions:

- Penrhos College was a Methodist girls-only boarding school founded in 1880 as a result of the generosity of Reverend Frederick Payne (1814–1895), a wealthy benefactor and Wesleyan Methodist minister who lived in Colwyn Bay. It was prominently situated above the promenade towards Rhos-on-Sea. Its motto was Semper ad lucem ("Always towards the light").
- Rydal School was founded (as Rydal Mount School) by Thomas Osborn in 1885 as a boys’ boarding school. It was named after the house – at the junction of Lansdowne Road and Pwllycrochan Avenue in Colwyn Bay – which Osborn had acquired from Reverend Payne. This is still the main school site. From 1977 it was a co-educational school. Its former motto was Prodesse quam conspici ("Do good without display").
- In the early 20th century both Rydal and Penrhos created preparatory or junior departments, which in due course each moved to its own premises.
- Rydal Preparatory School occupied Walshaw House, Oak Drive, Colwyn Bay when Rydal School was evacuated to Oakwood Park during the Second World War (see below). In 1946 when Rydal came back from Oakwood Park, the Preparatory School took its place there. It remained there until 1953, when it moved to its present site at Pwllycrochan. This had been the property of Lady Erskine, owner of the Pwllycrochan estate, and was developed as the Pwllycrochan Hotel before being bought by Rydal.
- Penrhos Junior School occupied a substantial house in Oak Drive, Colwyn Bay.
- Lyndon School was a private preparatory school in Colwyn Bay.

In 1887, Payne founded St John's Methodist Church on Pwllycrochan Avenue, which was used regularly by both Rydal and Penrhos. In 2010, the stewardship of St John's was passed to Rydal Penrhos, which needed more space for school worship and special events.

In 2020 it was announced that the school would no longer offer a boarding option from 2021 and would operate as a day school only.

== Architecture ==
A degree of uniformity of design in central Colwyn Bay owes much to a single architect, Sidney Colwyn Foulkes, whose concept has been followed by other architects. His father designed St John's Methodist Church, and he was responsible for many of the school's buildings, as well as others in the vicinity, and further afield in North Wales. This led to the area that includes the school being designated as Colwyn Bay's first conservation area.

== Evacuation of Rydal School ==
During the Second World War, the main campus of Rydal was occupied by the Ministry of Food. The school was evacuated to Oakwood Park, a small country estate two miles (three kilometres) west of the town of Conwy. The school returned to Colwyn Bay in 1946.

== Evacuation of Penrhos College ==
During the Second World War, the Penrhos College site was taken over by the government for Ministry of Food use. The Duke of Devonshire, anticipating that schoolgirls would make better tenants than soldiers, offered Chatsworth House for the use of the school. The contents of the house were packed away in eleven days and 300 girls and their teachers moved in for a six-year stay. The whole of the house was used, including the state rooms, which were turned into dormitories. Condensation from the breath of the sleeping girls caused fungus to grow behind some of the pictures. The house was not very comfortable for so many people, with a shortage of hot water, but there were compensations, such as skating on the Canal Pond. The girls grew vegetables in the garden as a contribution to the war effort.

== Amalgamation ==
Rydal Preparatory School merged with Penrhos Junior School in 1995 to become Rydal Penrhos Preparatory School, which, in 2003, underwent a further merger with Lyndon School, which retained its name until 2010. The former Penrhos Junior and Lyndon campuses were disposed of and staff and students were relocated to the larger existing Rydal Preparatory School campus.

In 1999, Rydal School and Penrhos College agreed to merge as Rydal Penrhos School. Initially they were run as three separate divisions: "preparatory", "girls" and "co-educational", reflecting the three formerly separate incarnations. The Penrhos College campus was eventually closed down and sold for redevelopment, and its pupils moved to the main Rydal campus, the divisions being amalgamated into a single entity. The merger and integration was not without controversy, not least over the sale of the former Penrhos site and the restructuring of the staff.

== Introduction of the International Baccalaureate ==
In 2004, the school began to offer the International Baccalaureate programme of study in its sixth form years, as a parallel alternative to the A-level programme that was already being offered. This led to an increase in the number of pupils attending the school from overseas countries such as Ukraine, Belgium, Canada, Germany, France, Kenya, Nigeria, Peru, Russia and the Czech Republic. The school stopped teaching the International Baccalaureate programme when it ceased to offer boarding, and currently offers A-levels and Cambridge Technical courses to its sixth-form students.

== First-class cricket ==
Rydal School
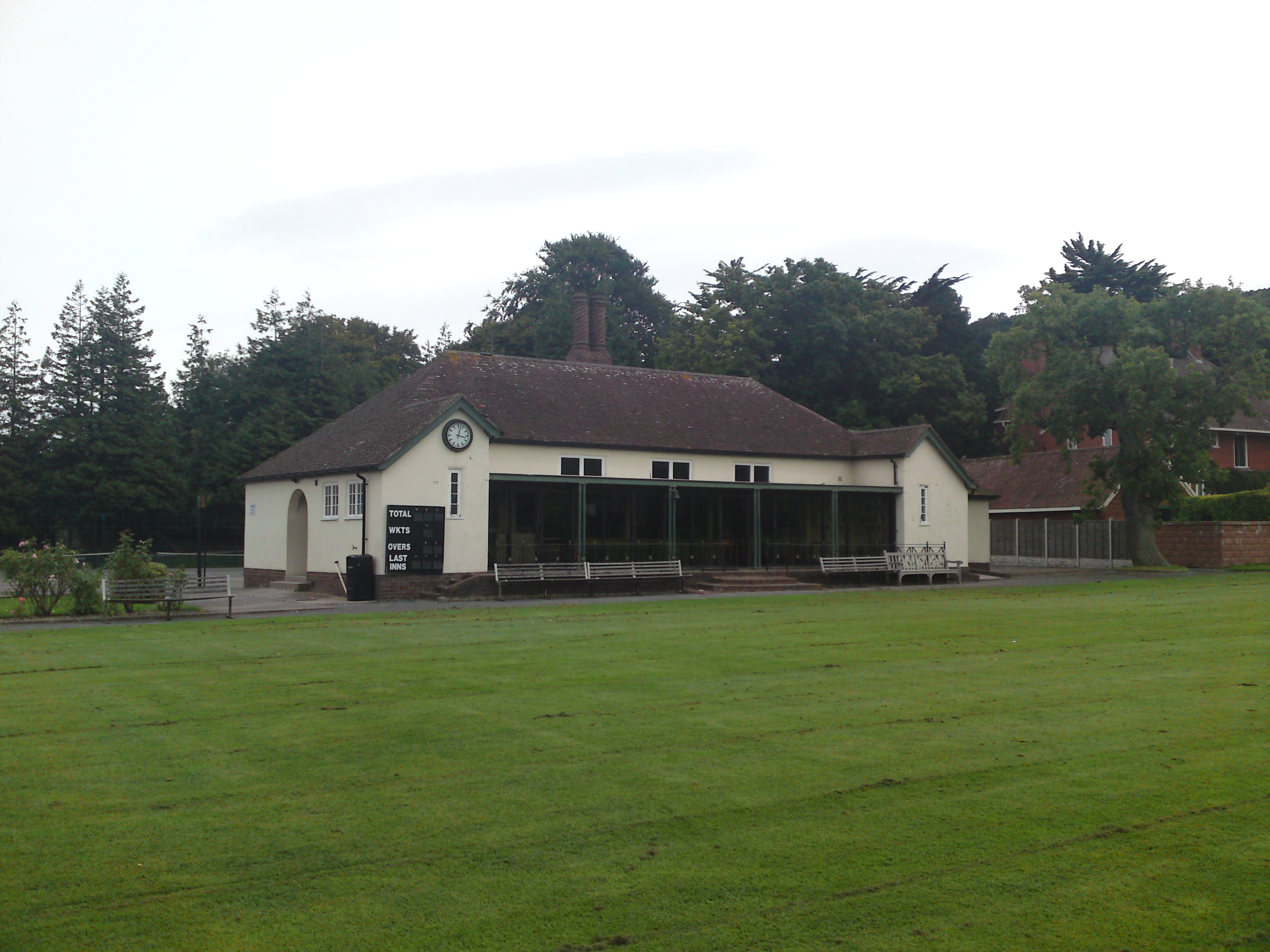
- The pavilion at New Field, Rydal Penrhos
- Interactive map of Rydal School

Ground information
- Location: Colwyn Bay, Wales
- Country: Wales
- Coordinates: 53°17′47″N 3°44′24″W

Team information
Wales	(1929)
Denbighshire	(1934)
- As of 10 August 2009; Source: CricketArchive

The school's cricket pitch was used as the venue for a first-class match between Wales and the touring South Africans in 1929. The three-day match, played on 10–12 June 1929, resulted in a 10-run victory for the South Africans and saw Bob Catterall of South Africa (117) and William Bates of Wales (102) record centuries. Denbighshire later played a single Minor Counties Championship match against Northumberland at the ground in 1934.

== Notable alumni ==
- Van McCann - Lead vocalist and guitarist of British indie rock band Catfish and the Bottlemen
- Leslie Goonewardene – Sri Lankan statesman and independence activist. He founded the country's first political party, the Lanka Sama Samaja Party and played a key role in both Indian and Sri Lankan independence.
- Edith Rigby (b. 1872) – suffragette and arsonist
- Wilf Wooller – First-class cricketer for Glamorgan CCC and Welsh international rugby union player
- Geoffrey Elton – historian, was a student at Rydal School and later taught there
- Lewis Elton – physicist, educational researcher and brother of Sir Geoffrey, was a student at Rydal School; father of Ben Elton
- William Roache – Long-running Coronation Street actor attended Rydal School
- Linus Roache – Actor best known for role in American series Law & Order attended Rydal School
- Duncan Kenworthy – Film producer, best known for producing films such as Four Weddings and a Funeral and Love Actually, attended Rydal School
- Bleddyn Williams – Wales rugby union captain, capped 22 times and also captained the British Lions in 1950
- Paula Yates – Television presenter who attended Penrhos College
- Anne Reid – Actress who attended Penrhos College
- Janet Hargreaves – Actress best known for her role as a Doctor Who villain, attended Penrhos College
- Angela Knight – Conservative MP attended Penrhos College
- Dafydd Wigley – Plaid Cymru Member of Parliament for Caernarfon from 1974 to 2001, Assembly Member for Caernarfon from 1999 to 2003, Leader of Plaid Cymru from 1991 to 2000
- Mervyn Davies, Baron Davies of Abersoch – Former banker and UK Labour government minister
- Andy Fenby – Professional rugby player for London Irish
- Michael Arditti – Novelist, literary critic and playwright attended Rydal School
- Ann Sophie – German singer and songwriter
- The Vivienne – Welsh drag queen and winner of RuPaul's Drag Race UK
- Gareth Davies (born 1988) – Welsh Conservative politician
- Sue Butterworth – bookseller and activist; attended Penrhos College
- Hugh Jones (politician) - Australian politician
- Jill Black, Lady Black of Derwent - (née Currie) former Justice of the Supreme Court, appointed 2017; attended Penrhos College
