= Oliver Tambo Heritage House =

National monument and museum in Lusaka, Zambia

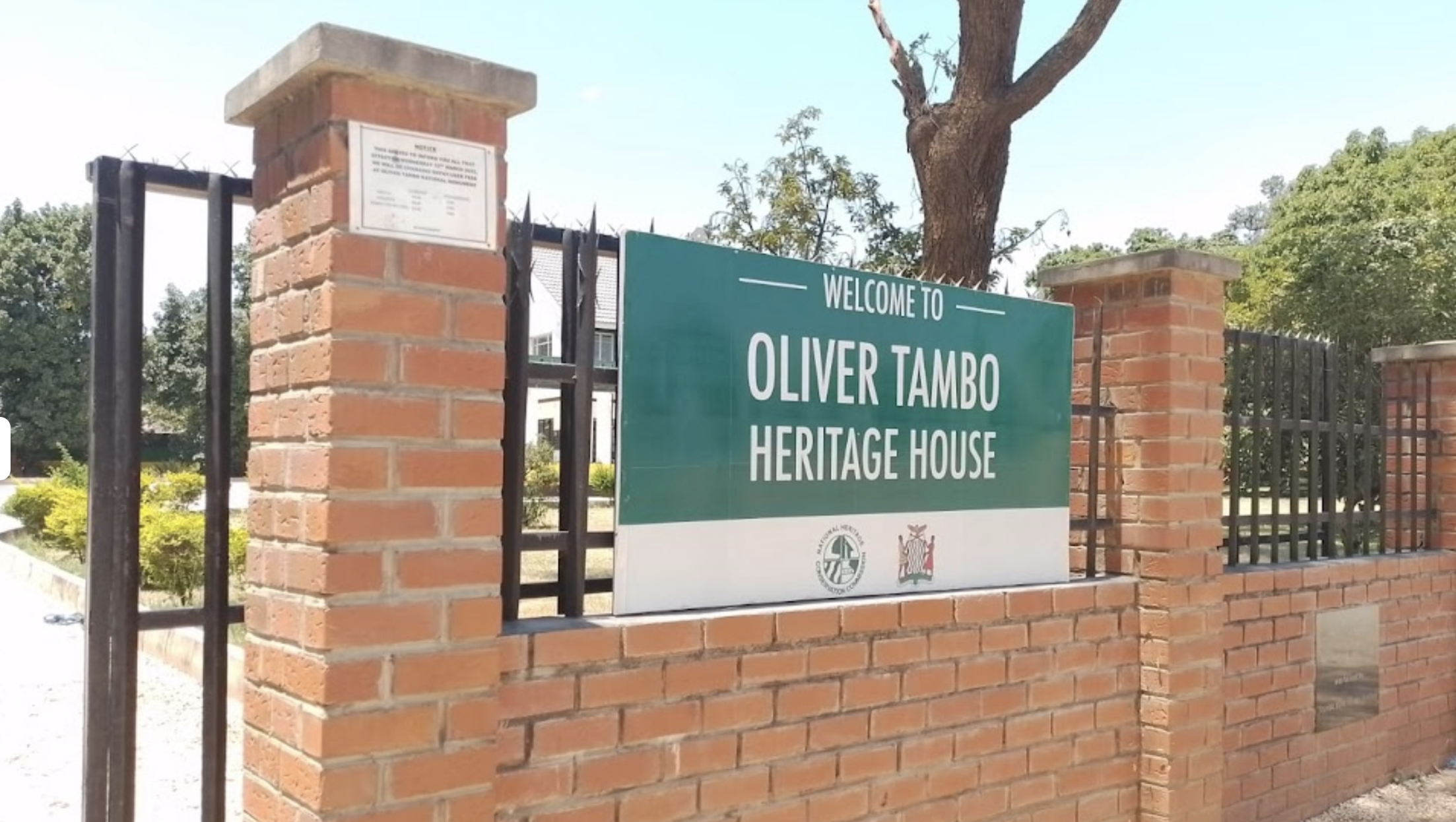
- Front Sign of Heritage House

General information
- Location: Lusaka, Lusaka Province, Zambia
- Coordinates: 15.373553°S 28.391733°E
- Operator: NHCC

Oliver Tambo Heritage House, is a national monument in Lusaka, Zambia located in the Avondale area along the Great East Road. It is the former home of exiled South African Freedom Fighter and African National Congress leader Oliver Tambo. He spent 22 years of his 30 years of exile living in this house in Lusaka at the invitation of the then Zambian Government. It was designated as a National monument in 2017 and became a museum open to the public.

It was officially opened in October 2017 by South African President Jacob Zuma, Zambian President Edgar Lungu and founding Zambian President Kenneth Kaunda.

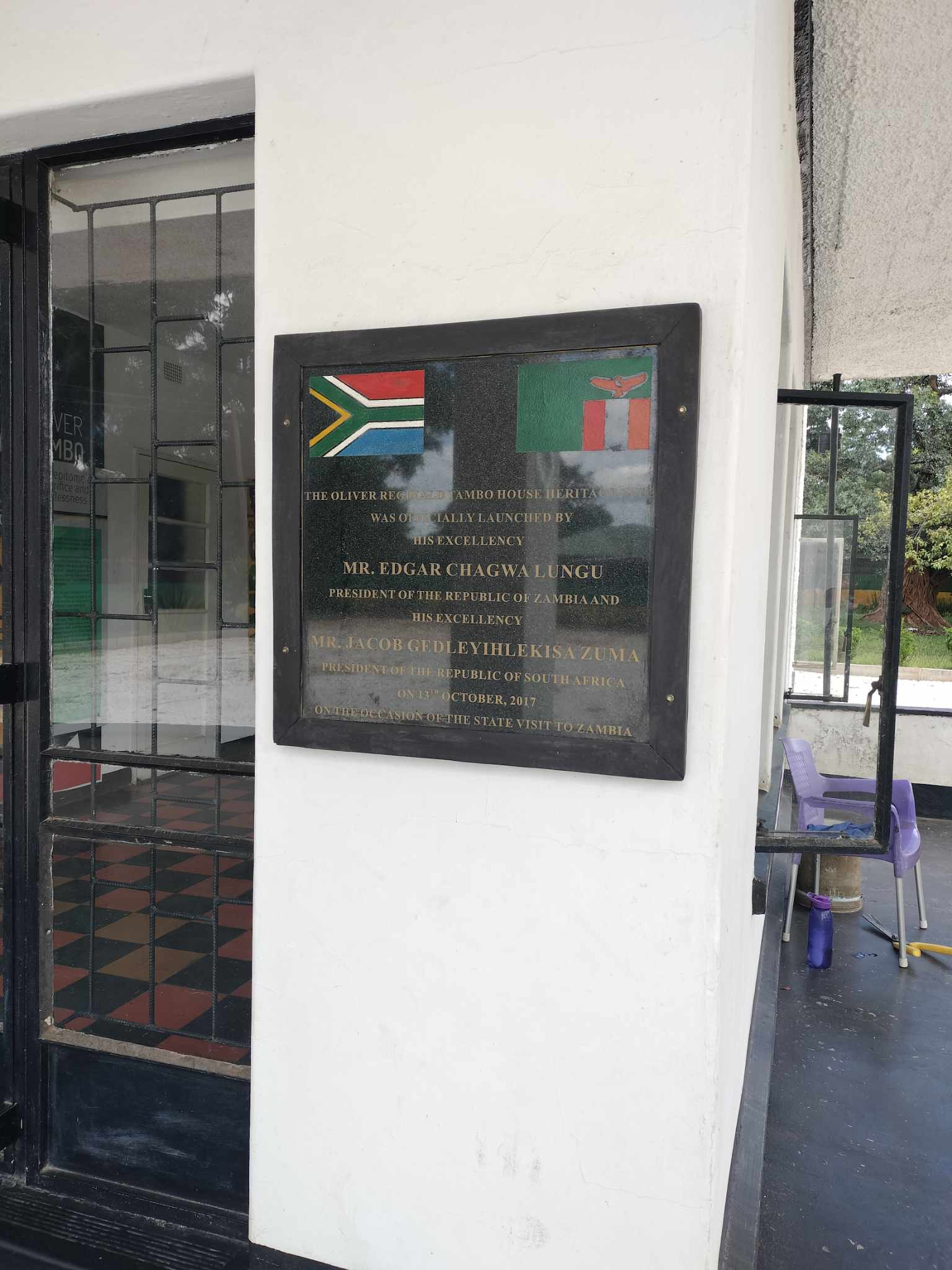
Plaque marking the opening of the museum

The safe house was specifically designed so that the upstairs apartment, where Tambo lived, was entirely separate from the downstairs area where uMkhonto we Sizwe soldiers stayed, with the only staircase being on the outside at the back of the property. The intention was that if the property was attacked, this would give Tambo sufficient time to escape as attackers tried to access the downstairs of the property.

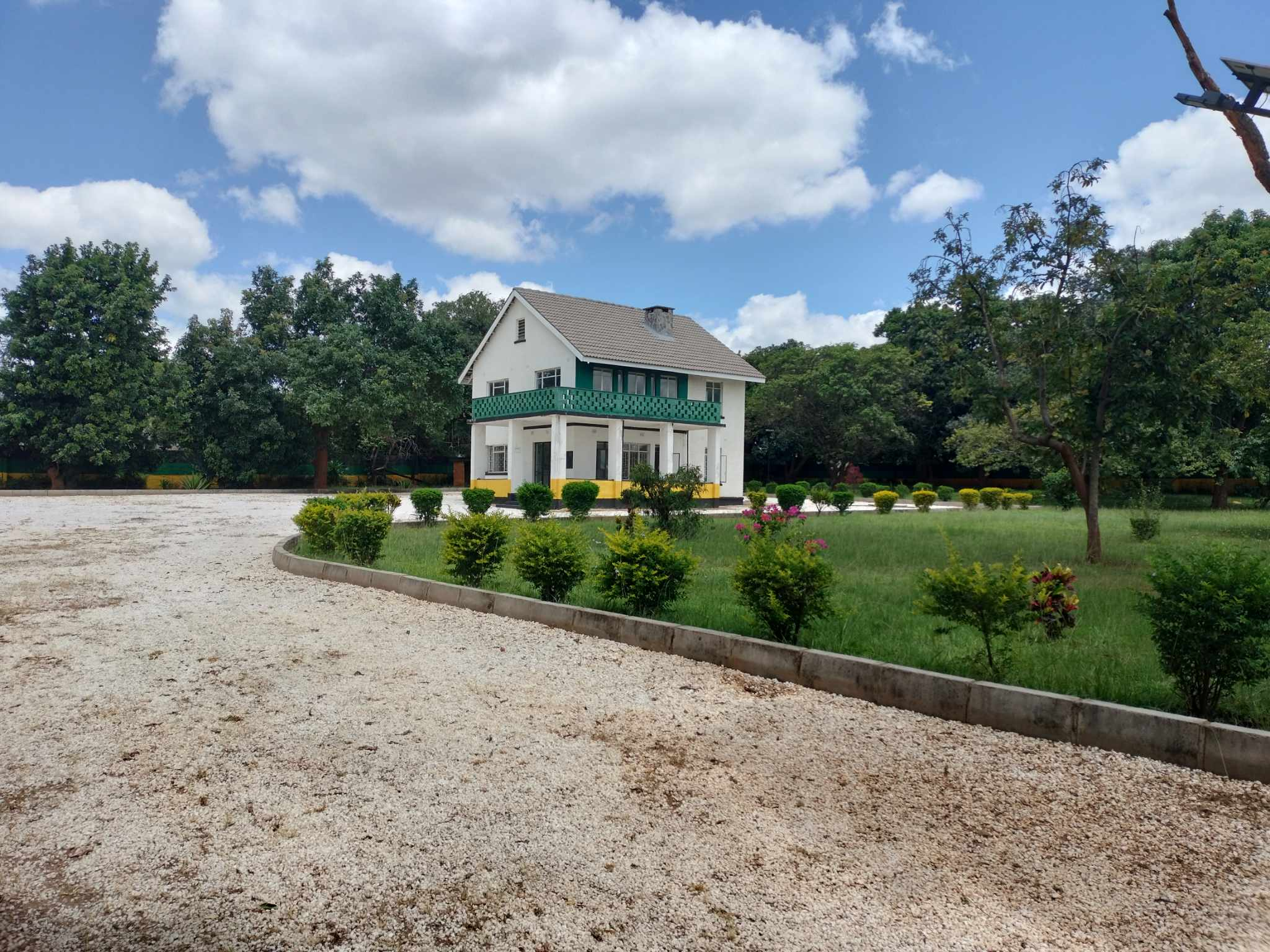
The ANC Safe House from the front
