= Silver Moon Bookshop =

Feminist bookstore in London, United Kingdom

Silver Moon Women's Bookshop
- Founded: May 1984
- Founders: Jane Cholmeley, Sue Butterworth, and Jane Anger
- Dissolved: 18 November 2001
- Type: Feminist bookstore
- Location: 68 Charing Cross Road, London, England
- Coordinates: 51.5124°N 0.1285°W
- Region served: London / International (via mail order)
- Products: Women's literature, lesbian fiction, non-fiction (by/about women)
- Awards: Pandora Award (1989), Pink Paper Award (2001)
- Remarks: Europe's largest women's bookshop at the time of closure; later incorporated into Foyles.

The Silver Moon Women's Bookshop was a feminist bookstore at 68 Charing Cross Road in London, England, founded in 1984 by Jane Cholmeley, Sue Butterworth, and Jane Anger. They established Silver Moon Bookshop to promote women’s writing, serve a community of readers and encourage discussion of women’s issues. The shop served both as a safe space for women to participate in literary events and a resource centre to learn about local feminist initiatives.

In 1989, Silver Moon Bookshop won the Pandora Award for "contributing most to promoting the status of women in publishing and related trades". In November 2001, Silver Moon won the Pink Paper Award, sponsored by The Mike Rhodes Trust, “for promoting an understanding of lesbian and gay life, for 17 years of campaigning, support and advice given by Silver Moon bookshop in central London”. After 17 years, the shop closed on 18 November 2001.

== Opening ==
Silver Moon bookshop opened in May 1984 and was associated with the women in print movement, an international effort by second-wave feminists to establish autonomous communication networks created by and for women, including feminist periodicals, presses, and bookstores. Its name derived from two feminist symbols and from the title of a poem by Sappho. The Greater London Council (GLC), as part of their effort to maintain Charing Cross Road as a bookselling street and international tourist attraction, had offered two shop units for rent “solely for bookshop use”. Number 68 Charing Cross Road was extremely dilapidated. Silver Moon raised £47,304 from family and friends and a capital grant from the GLC for the refurbishment of their shop and purchase of initial stock. This was a prime location on the best bookselling street in the country. Cholmeley wanted to make women's writing more visible, and she "didn't want to open in sort of an outer borough, [she] wanted to say, you know '51% of the population – We're here, we're good and we absolutely deserve to be in the center of things'".

Before the GLC was disbanded in 1986, it delivered grants to many feminist organisations. The GLC was committed to eliminating barriers that prevented minority communities from accessing art and entering creative industries. The GLC recognised that “It is cultural distribution not cultural production that is the key locus of power and profit.” This mission aligned with Silver Moon Bookshop, whose objective was to provide public access to literature written by marginalized women. The GLC said “Silver Moon is a project of strategic importance.”

== Shop ==
=== Literature ===
All of the fiction available for purchase at the Silver Moon Bookshop was written by women. Authors whose work was featured included Barbara Wilson, Ellen Hart, Claire McNab, Katherine V. Forrest, Val McDermid, Pat Barker, Doris Lessing, Willa Cather, Alison Lurie and Joan Barfoot. Male authors were included in the non-fiction section, but only if their books are about women. Silver Moon Bookshop had prominent representation of female authors of colour. Lesbian and Black women writers had their own dedicated sections to promote their writing. Teachers and librarians used Silver Moon Bookshop as a book supplier and feminist resource, which increased public accessibility of diverse literature.

=== Organisational structure ===
Silver Moon was set up as a company limited by guarantee and adopted inclusive working practices such as job rotation, equal pay and collective working. These working practices were advocated by the Federation of Radical Booksellers and the Women’s Liberation Movement as they “wanted to share out skills, thus empowering women." But high street retail is extremely time pressured, and these working methods led to inefficient decision making and miscommunication with customers.

Silver Moon Bookshop was dedicated to providing ethical compensation and benefits to employees. The owners opposed capitalist hierarchies that fostered a culture of power imbalance. However, Silver Moon Bookshop's short-lived use of job rotation as a feminist collective practice led to inefficient decision-making and miscommunication with customers. Silver Moon moved to an ‘open management’ style, which was a modified hierarchy that still guaranteed all employees a voice in everyday shop functions. There were monthly staff meetings and staff dinners to discuss all aspects of the business,

=== Events ===
Silver Moon Bookshop frequently hosted visits from female authors, including Toni Morrison, Margaret Atwood, Alice Walker, Paule Marshall, Barbara Wilson, Jeanette Winterson, and Sandi Toksvig. One noteworthy event was a book signing by Maya Angelou, which generated a huge queue of customers and fans stretching down Charing Cross Road.

=== Community activism ===
Silver Moon Bookshop served as a hub for feminist information-sharing and activism. Women's political organisations and writing collectives promoted their groups on the store noticeboard and distributed handouts advertising upcoming events. The Pink Paper, a gay and lesbian free newspaper, was made available by the noticeboard. Silver Moon Bookshop donated to intersectional feminist organisations such as Feminist Audiobooks, founded by Kirsten Hearn, which worked to increase literary accessibility for women with visual impairments.

Employees provided support to female clientele experiencing abuse by directing them to nearby women's centres and suggesting books written to help sexual violence victims. Cholmeley said that "sometimes [she] felt more like a social worker than a bookseller".

=== Silver Moon Café ===
In May 1984, the Silver Moon Café was established in the basement of the Silver Moon Bookshop. Almost all of the menu items sold at the café were produced or sourced by women. Café membership was exclusively offered to female patrons, in order to create a designated safe place for women to convene. The café eventually evolved to become a central gathering point for the local lesbian community.

Silver Moon was criticised for solely offering women membership. When Cholmeley applied to the City of Westminster for an alcohol licence, the application was turned down because there was no gents' toilet. When it was explained that the café was women only and therefore did not need a gent’s toilet, the response was that “This licensing panel is of the opinion that sooner or later you will change your mind and admit men." The café was eventually shut down after 18 months of operation.

== Publications ==
=== Silver Moon Books ===
In 1990, Cholmeley and Butterworth established an associated publishing business, Silver Moon Books. Silver Moon Books primarily published lesbian mystery and romance novels. Books published include the lesbian romance novels Curious Wine by Katherine V. Forrest in 1990, Under the Southern Cross by Claire McNab in 1992, the anthology Diving Deep: Erotic Lesbian Love Stories by Katherine V. Forrest and Barbara Grier in 1993, and the lesbian detective novel First Impressions by Kate Calloway in 1996.

=== Silver Moon Quarterly ===
The Silver Moon Quarterly (SMQ) was a newsletter established by Butterworth that promoted women’s writing and feminist and lesbian books through reviews and recommendations. Additionally, the newsletter publicized future shop programming, such as author signings. Butterworth and Cholmeley found that The Silver Moon Quarterly played a significant role in elevating business and heightening global visibility of feminist literature.

While there were high production and delivery costs, Cholmeley believed that The Silver Moon Quarterly was a worthwhile investment because "there [were] millions of women who [did] not have access to women's writing, and this [was] a means of reaching them".

By the later 1990s, at least 10,000 people had signed up to receive the publication. The SMQ gained an international audience, as one quarter of the subscribers lived outside of Britain.

=== By the Light of the Silvery Moon ===
To celebrate the 10-year anniversary of the Silver Moon Bookshop in 1994, Virago published By the Light of the Silvery Moon. Honouring Silver Moon Bookshop's promotion of LGBTQ+ and women's voices, the publication's 15 short stories included themes of feminism and lesbianism. Authors featured included Lisa Tuttle, Ellen Galford, Lisa Alther, Liza Cody, Merle Collins, Zoë Fairbairns, Sara Maitland, Ellen Galford, Elizabeth Jolley, Shena Mackay, Suniti Namjoshi, Hanan al-Shaykh and Sarah Schulman.

=== A Bookshop of One's Own ===
On 29 February 2024, Harper Collins published Jane Cholmeley's book of Silver Moon's story, A Bookshop of One's Own. This was reviewed in the TLS by Libby Purves, who said: "Cholmeley is an energizing riot, full of humour and grit, and her story is well worth telling." The review of A Bookshop of One's Own by Zoe Fairbairns on the Fawcett Society website concluded: "Part-memoir, part manifesto, part how-to guide, part how-not-to guide, it is available from all good bookshops."

== Challenges ==
The shop received hate mail, obscene phone calls, a death threat, a knife attack, men "flashing" female customers, and huge amounts of verbal abuse. On several occasions, the shop needed to call the police.

Section 28 of the Local Government Bill was passed in May 1988 which said that local authorities “shall not … intentionally promote homosexuality or publish material with the intention of promoting homosexuality” or “promote the teaching in any maintained school of the acceptability of homosexuality as a pretended family relationship." In the political climate created by Section 28, deliveries of lesbian (and other) books from America to Silver Moon were delayed and damaged by the Post Office.

== Closing ==
Silver Moon Bookshop, by then Europe’s largest women’s bookshop, closed on 18 November 2001, due to rising rents from its landlord, the Soho Housing Association. Additionally, the collapse of the Net Book Agreement in December 1994 and the arrival of Amazon in the UK in 1998 opened the floodgates of discounting. Silver Moon saw their profits drop as their costs increased.

In 2001, Silver Moon Bookshop was incorporated into Foyles. Foyles established a "Silver Moon at Foyles" department that promoted female authors and feminist literature. Butterworth expressed warmth toward the acquisition and held high hopes for the future of the Silver Moon brand under Foyle's direction. The Silver Moon at Foyles department closed in 2004.

== See also ==
- Independent bookstore
- Gay's the Word (bookshop)
- Sisterwrite
