= Sisterwrite =

Feminist bookshop in London, England

Coordinates: 51.5425°N 0.1032°W

Sisterwrite was Britain's first feminist bookshop. The bookshop, which opened in 1978, was run as a collective. Sisterwrite was located at 190 Upper Street, in the Islington district of north London.

== Founding ==
Mary Coghill and Kay Stirling invited Lynn Alderson to join them in opening a women's bookshop. The three of them became the founders of Sisterwrite. Money was tight at the beginning, however, Mary was able to give £5,000 towards its opening and her sister gave £3,000. They began fundraising and sent a letter around to different organisations and women to sign, showing their support. Once they reached £11,000, they began to work on opening the shop. The opening was a difficult process as all three women lived in squats and relied on welfare benefits while they paid off debts and worked until Sisterwrite became economically viable. The squatting community became a feminist, urban phenomenon as women were able to discuss the Women's Liberation movement in a safe space.

== Focus and expansion ==
Sisterwrite was commended for its knowledgeable workers led by Coghill, Stirling, and Alderson, and their willingness to discuss women's literature with patrons. The bookshop also contained a cafe, called Sisterbite.

Sisterwrite was notable for having a lesbian book section, and became a hub for the local lesbian community. Sisterwrite displayed the Women's Liberation Movement to wider circles of women and became a safe space for lesbian and queer women to meet and feel they are central to this movement. Sisterwrite was able to aid the women’s mental health movement by providing a hub for women to discuss and read about shared mental health struggles.

In 1985, Sisterwrite underwent an important transformation from a collective of white activists to a multiracial group. This change catalyzed the expansion of the section which included black literature and called for the incorporation of literature from women worldwide. The Sisterwrite Collective intentionally sought to amplify the voices of Black women, enriching the Bookshop's legacy and adding to the shop's many accomplishments.

== Closure ==
Despite their persistent fight to remain open amidst a recession, multiple burglaries and the inability to park near the shop, on 7 August 1993, Sisterwrite closed for good. However, the closure of Sisterwrite did not signify a decline in interest in women’s writing; the collective workers stated that the demand for female literature tripled since the mid-1980s.

== See also ==
- Silver Moon Bookshop
- Gay's the Word (bookshop)
