= Mount Tambo =

Mountain in Victoria, Australia

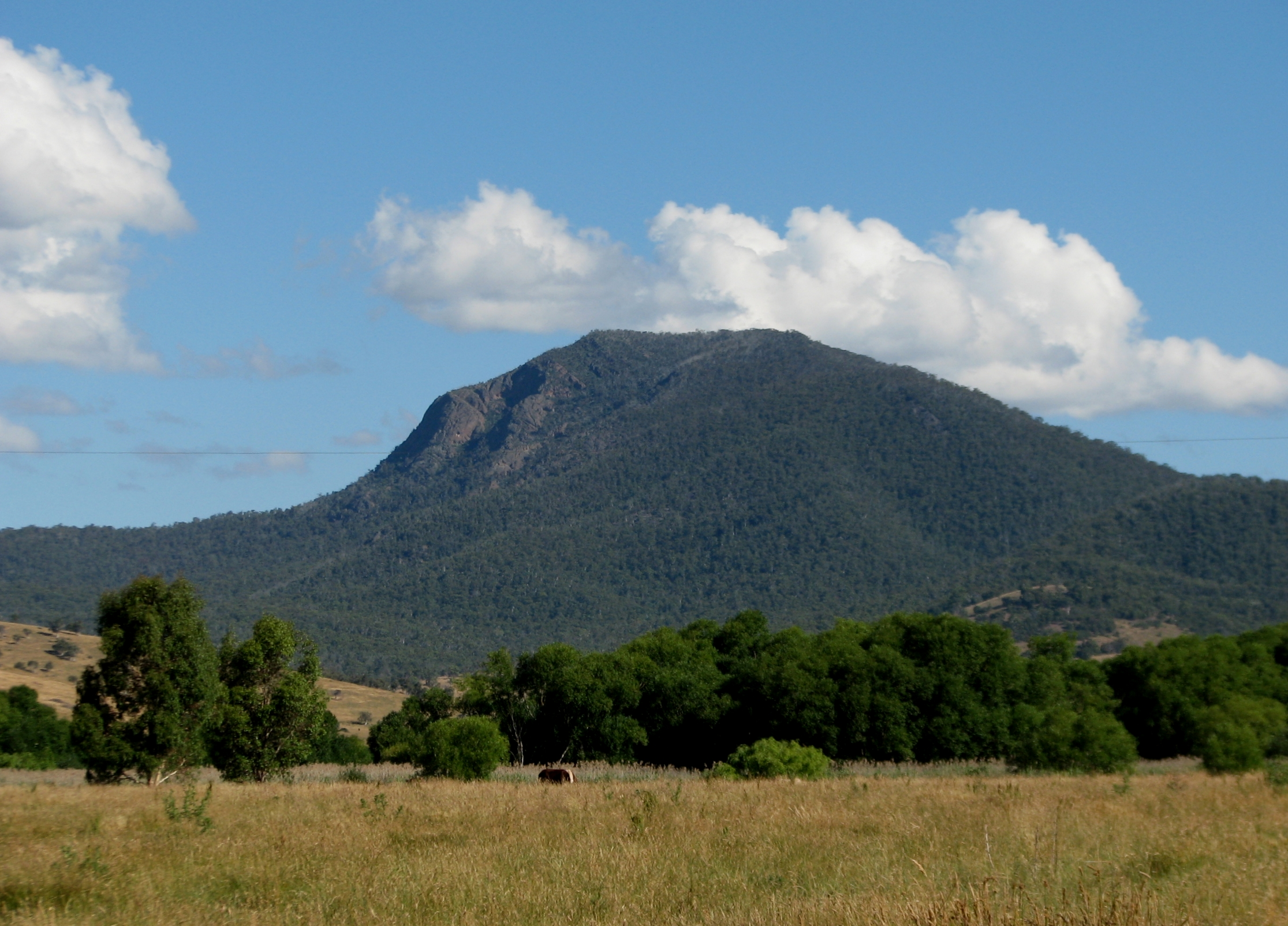
- Mount Tambo viewed from Benambra

Highest point
- Elevation: 1,430 metres (4,692 ft) AHD
- Coordinates: 37°00′28″S 147°48′29″E

Geography
- Location within Victoria
- Location: Victoria, Australia
- Parent range: Great Dividing Range

Mount Tambo is a mountain located to the north-east of Omeo in Victoria, Australia. Its peak is 1,430 metres above sea level. It lies within the boundaries of the 6,050 hectare Marble Gully – Mount Tambo Nature Conservation Reserve.

The 2,740 hectare Mount Tambo Reserve was listed on the Register of the National Estate in 1990.

Rare plant species found in Marble Gully – Mount Tambo Nature Conservation Reserve include marble daisy bush, delicate New Holland-daisy, and limestone pomaderris.

To the near north-east is Little Mount Tambo (1,227 metres). The headwaters from Deep Creek, which feeds in to the Tambo River, are on the south-east slopes.

It marks the intersection of the boundaries of the counties of Benambra, Dargo and Tambo.

While travelling with Georg Neumayer's expedition to Mount Kosciuszko in 1862, the painter Eugene von Guerard produced a sketch Mt Tambo & Omeo Swamps 10 Nov 62 and later an oil painting Mount Tambo from the Omeo Station 1862.

== See also ==
- Alpine National Park
- List of mountains in Australia § Victoria
