= Nkantolo =

- Location within Eastern Cape Location within South Africa
- Coordinates: 30.783°S 29.670°E
- Country: South Africa
- Province: Eastern Cape
- District: Alfred Nzo
- Municipality: Winnie Madikizela-Mandela

Area
  - Total: 3.95 km^{2} (1.53 sq mi)

Population (2011)
  - Total: 1,138
  - Density: 288/km^{2} (746/sq mi)

Racial makeup (2011)
  - Black African: 99.7%
  - Coloured: 0.1%
  - Indian/Asian: 0.1%
  - White: 0.1%

First languages (2011)
  - Xhosa: 95.4%
  - English: 1.7%
  - Sotho: 1.1%
  - Other: 1.8%
- Time zone: UTC+2 (SAST)

Nkantolo is a village in Winnie Madikizela-Mandela Local Municipality in the Eastern Cape province of South Africa. It is known as the birthplace of former African National Congress president and revolutionary, Oliver Tambo.
