= Women in Publishing =

Group focused on women in the publishing industry

Women in Publishing (WiP) is a London-based group, established in 1979, that works to promote the status of women working in the publishing industry and related trades by helping women to develop their careers. Their founding aims – "to encourage networking, to provide opportunities for sharing information and ideas and to offer training for career and personal development – still stand in the so-called ‘post-feminist’ era, where women dominate the publishing industry by sheer numbers, but have barely broken through the glass ceiling."

== History ==
Women in Publishing was started in 1979. In December that year, an open meeting was held in an upstairs room at the Globe pub, opposite Baker Street tube station. Attended by some 100 women, the meeting was chaired by Anne McDermid, with the discussion being led by Liz Calder and Ursula Owen (co-founder with Carmen Callil of the publishing company Virago).

== Aims ==
The stated aims of WiP, which holds meetings on the second Wednesday of each month, are:

- To provide a forum for the discussion of ideas, trends and subjects of interest to women in the publishing trades
- To encourage networking and mutual support among women
- To provide opportunities for sharing information and expertise
- To support and publicize women's achievements and successes
- To promote the status of women within publishing.

== Awards ==
WiP presents annual awards, chosen by nomination, in two categories:

- The Pandora Award, presented since 1981 for significant and sustained contribution to the publishing industry. Winners have included Carole Blake (2013), Marjorie Scardino (2012), Suzanne Collier (2011), WILDE Network (2010), Mslexia (2009), Zed Books (2008), Judy Piatkus (2005), Persephone Books (2002), Honno (2001), Fay Weldon (1997) the Feminist Library (1995), Anita Miller (1996), Margaret Busby (1993), Ros de Lanerolle (1992), Silver Moon Bookshop (1989) and Hazel Cushion.
- The New Venture Award, for pioneering work on behalf of under-represented groups in society.
