= Anti-Apartheid Movement =

1959–1994 British anti-apartheid organisation

The Anti-Apartheid Movement (AAM) was a British organisation that was at the centre of the international movement opposing the South African apartheid system and supporting South Africa's non-white populations who were segregated by the policies of apartheid. The AAM changed its name to ACTSA: Action for Southern Africa in 1994, when South Africa achieved majority rule through free and fair elections, in which all races could vote.

== History ==
=== A consumer boycott organisation ===
In response to an appeal by Albert Luthuli, the Boycott Movement was founded in London on 26 June 1959 at a meeting of South African exiles and their supporters. Nelson Mandela was an important person among the many that were anti-apartheid activists. Members included Vella Pillay, Ros Ainslie, Abdul Minty and Nanda Naidoo. Julius Nyerere would summarise its purpose:

We are not asking you, the British people, for anything special. We are just asking you to withdraw your support from apartheid by not buying South African goods.

The boycott attracted widespread support from students, trade unions and the Labour, Liberal and Communist parties. On 28 February 1960, the movement launched a March Month, Boycott Action at a rally in Trafalgar Square. Speakers at the rally included Labour Party Leader Hugh Gaitskell, Liberal MP Jeremy Thorpe, Conservative peer John Grigg, 2nd Baron Altrincham, and Tennyson Makiwane of the African National Congress.

=== Expansion and renaming ===
The Sharpeville massacre occurred on 21 March 1960, when 69 unarmed protesters were shot dead by the South African police. This triggered an intensification of action. The organisation was renamed the "Anti-Apartheid Movement" and instead of just a consumer boycott, the group would now "co-ordinate all the anti-apartheid work and keep South Africa's apartheid policy in the forefront of British politics". It also campaigned for the total isolation of apartheid South Africa, including economic sanctions.

At the time, the United Kingdom was South Africa's largest foreign investor and South Africa was the UK's third biggest export market. The ANC was still committed to peaceful resistance. Armed struggle through Umkhonto we Sizwe would only begin a year later.

=== Early successes ===
==== Commonwealth membership ====
The AAM scored its first major victory when South Africa was forced to leave the Commonwealth in 1961. It held a 72-hour vigil outside the Commonwealth Secretariat venue, Marlborough House, and found willing allies in Canada, India and the newly independent Afro-Asian Commonwealth member states. In 1962, the United Nations General Assembly passed a resolution calling on all member states to impose a trade boycott against South Africa. In 1963, the UN Security Council called for a partial arms ban against South Africa, but this was not mandatory under Chapter VII of the UN Charter.

==== Olympic participation ====
Abdul Minty, who took over from Rosalynde Ainslie as the AAM's Hon. Secretary in 1962, also represented the South African Sports Association, a non-racial body set up in South Africa by Dennis Brutus. In the same year, he presented a letter to the International Olympic Committee meeting in Baden-Baden, Germany about racial segregation in South African sports. The result was a ruling that suspended South Africa from the 1964 Tokyo Olympics. South Africa was finally expelled from the Olympics in 1970.

=== Economic sanctions campaign ===
In November 1962, the United Nations General Assembly passed Resolution 1761, a non-binding resolution establishing the United Nations Special Committee against Apartheid and called for imposing economic and other sanctions on South Africa. All Western nations refused to join the committee as members. This boycott of a committee, the first such boycott, happened because it was created by the same General Assembly resolution that called for economic and other sanctions on South Africa, which at the time the West strongly opposed.

Following the passage of this resolution, the Anti-Apartheid Movement spearheaded the arrangements for international conference on sanctions to be held in London in April 1964. According to Lisson, "The aim of the Conference was to work out the practicability of economic sanctions and their implications on the economies of South Africa, the UK, the US and the Protectorates. Knowing that the strongest opposition to the application of sanctions came from the West (and within the West, the UK), the Committee made every effort to attract as wide and varied a number of speakers and participants as possible so that the conference findings would be regarded as objective."

The conference was named the International Conference for Economic Sanctions Against South Africa. Lisson writes:

The Conference established the necessity, the legality and the practicability of internationally organised sanctions against South Africa, whose policies were seen to have become a direct threat to peace and security in Africa and the world. Its findings also pointed out that in order to be effective, a programme of sanctions would need the active participation of Britain and the US, who were also the main obstacle to the implementation of such a policy.

The AAM was enthusiastic with the results of the conference for two key reasons. First, because of "the new seriousness with which the use of economic sanctions is viewed." Second, because the AAM was able to meet for the first time with the UN Special Committee on Apartheid, a meeting that established a long-lasting working relationship between the two parties.

However, the conference was not successful in persuading the UK to take up economic sanctions against South Africa. Rather, the British government "remained firm in its view that the imposition of sanctions would be unconstitutional "because we do not accept that this situation in South Africa constitutes a threat to international peace and security and we do not in any case believe that sanctions would have the effect of persuading the South African Government to change its policies"."

==== Making sanctions an election issue ====
The Anti-Apartheid Movement tried to make sanctions an election issue for the 1964 general election. Candidates were asked to state their position on economic sanctions and other punitive measures against the South African government. Most candidates who responded answered in the affirmative. Following the Labour Party's victory at the 1964 general election, after 13 years in opposition, commitment to the anti-apartheid cause dissipated. In short order, UK Prime Minister Harold Wilson told the press that his Labour Party was "not in favour of trade sanctions partly because, even if fully effective, they would harm the people we are most concerned about; the Africans and those White South Africans who are having to maintain some standard of decency there." Even so, Lisson writes that the "AAM still hoped that the new Labour Government would be more sensitive to the demands of public opinion than the previous Government." But by the end of 1964, it was clear that the election of the Labour Party had made little difference in the government's overall unwillingness to impose sanctions.

==== Rejection by the West ====
Lisson summarises the UN situation in 1964:

At the UN, Britain consistently refused to accept that the situation in South Africa fell under Chapter VII of the [United Nations] Charter. Instead, in collaboration with the US, it worked for a carefully worded appeal on the Rivonia Trial and other political trials to try to appease Afro-Asian countries and public opinion at home and abroad; by early 1965 the issue of sanctions had lost momentum.

=== Academic boycott campaign ===
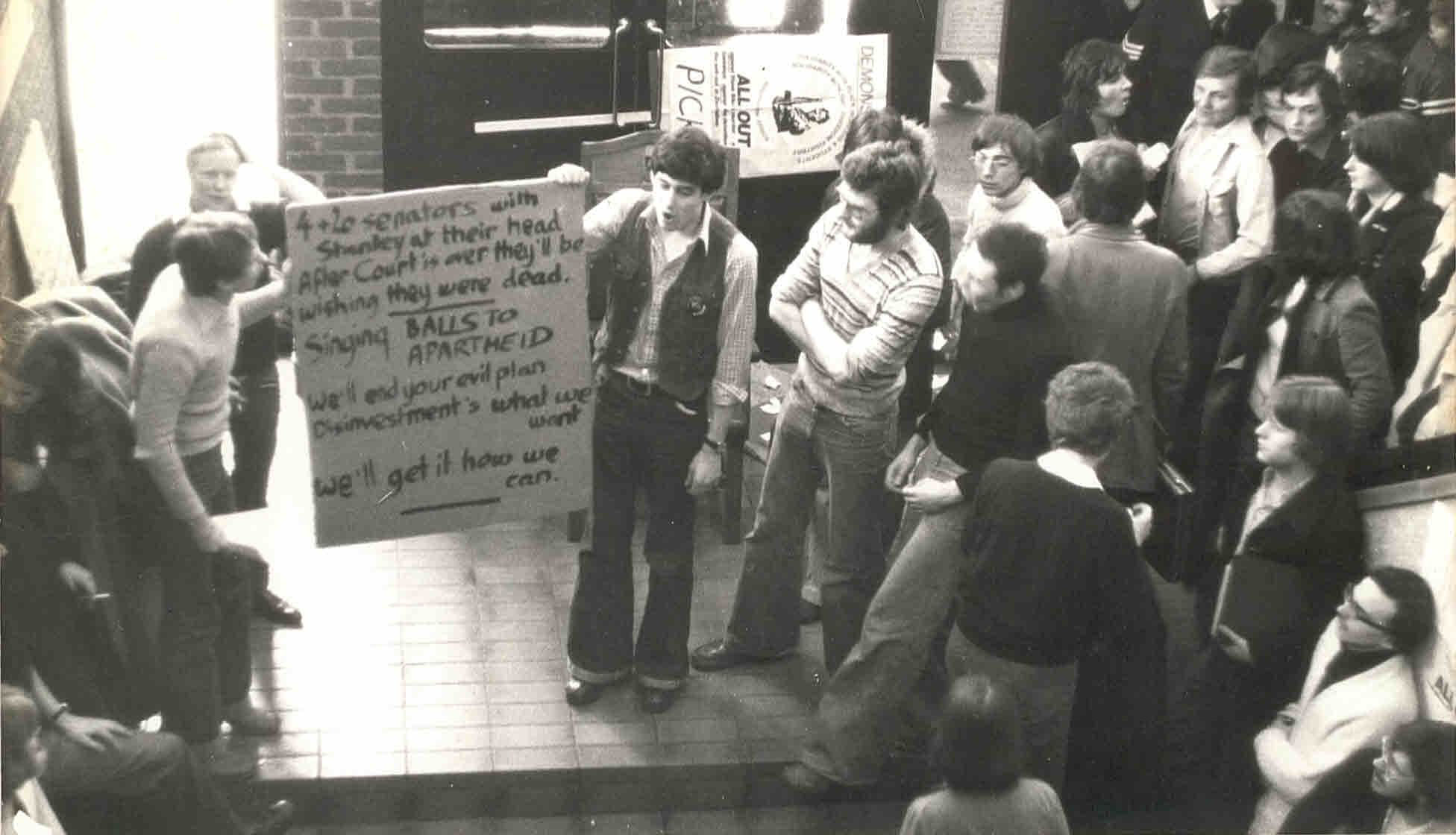
Demonstration against apartheid at the University of Hull, 1978

The Anti-Apartheid Movement was instrumental in initiating an academic boycott of South Africa in 1965. The declaration was signed by 496 university professors and lecturers from 34 British universities to protest against apartheid and associated violations of academic freedom. They made a special reference to the issue of banning orders against two South African academics named Jack Simons and Eddie Roux, who were two well-known progressive academics.

A part of the declaration:

Academic Boycott of South Africa: Declaration by British Academics, 1965

We, the (undersigned) professors and lecturers in British universities in consultation with the Anti-Apartheid Movement:

1. Protest against the bans imposed on Professors Simons and Roux;
2. Protest against the practice of racial discrimination and its extension to higher education;
3. Pledge that we shall not apply for or accept academic posts in South African universities which practise racial discrimination.

=== Cooperation with the United Nations ===
Faced with the failure to persuade the West to impose economic sanctions, in 1966 the AAM formulated a strategy whereby they would shift toward spearheading "an international campaign against apartheid under the auspices of the United Nations." AAM's proposed strategy was approved by the UN Special Committee on Apartheid and then by the General Assembly. This new partnership formed the basis for all future action against apartheid. The man originally responsible for the new strategy gives this summary:

The strategy was to press for a range of measures to isolate the regime, support the liberation movement and inform world public opinion; to continue pressing for effective sanctions as the only means for a peaceful solution, and at the same time to obtain action on other measures which could be decided by a majority vote in the General Assembly; to isolate the major trading partners of South Africa by persuading other Western countries to co-operate in action to the greatest feasible extent; and to find ways to promote public opinion and public action against apartheid, especially in the countries which were the main collaborators with the South African regime. This also meant that we built the broadest support for each measure, thereby welcoming co-operation rather than alienating governments and organisations which were not yet prepared to support sanctions or armed struggle.

=== The Free Nelson Mandela Campaign ===
In the 1980s, the international campaign to free Nelson Mandela from prison became a global cause. In close co-operation with the exiled leaders of the ANC, the British Anti-Apartheid Movement increasingly personalised the liberation struggle, with Mandela as its symbolic figurehead. The Anti-Apartheid Movement worked with a range of organisations in Britain, such as the International Defence and Aid Fund, local council authorities, churches, and trade unions, to demand Mandela's release from prison and campaign for the end of apartheid in South Africa. A notable feature of the campaign across Britain was the renaming of buildings and streets after Nelson Mandela, which resulted in the UK having more streets named after him than anywhere outside of South Africa. The Free Nelson Mandela Campaign gained prominence when Glasgow's local authority gave Mandela the Freedom of the City in 1981, and a further eight cities and councils including Aberdeen, Dundee, and Sheffield followed this lead during the 1980s.

A major part of the campaign revolved around music, which helped publicise Mandela and the anti-apartheid struggle to the British public. In 1984, The Special A.K.A released the hit single "Free Nelson Mandela" which reached number 9 in the UK music charts. In 1986, Artists Against Apartheid organised the Freedom Festival at Clapham Common in London, in which 250,000 people attended. The most famous event was The Nelson Mandela 70th Birthday Tribute, which hoped to secure his release in time for his 70th birthday in June 1988. There were four elements to "Freedom at 70": the Nelson Mandela 70th Birthday Tribute concert held at Wembley Stadium on 11 June; a rally in Glasgow to launch the Nelson Mandela Freedom March on 12 June; and the five-week long Freedom March from Glasgow to London, which finished with a rally in Hyde Park on 17 July 1988. These events attracted an unprecedented level of interest in the Anti-Apartheid Movement and the struggle against apartheid. For example, the Wembley Stadium concert was attended by about 100,000 people and an estimated 600 million people in more than 60 countries watched the event.

As a direct consequence of the 70th Birthday Tribute, the Anti-Apartheid Movement membership doubled to nearly 18,000 in 1988.

== Organisational structure ==
The AAM was composed of a national office, local groups, and regional committees, as well as a wide range of affiliations and connections to organisations across civil society. There was also a Scottish Anti-Apartheid Committee (SCAAM) and a Welsh Anti-Apartheid Movement (WAAM) which co-ordinated activities in these nations. In the case of WAAM, it sought to utilise Welsh identity, language, and culture to assist its mobilisation and campaigning efforts across the country. A notable Welsh campaign was against the Welsh Rugby Union and its connections with apartheid South Africa, which ultimately led to it breaking ties with the South African Rugby Board in 1989.

The AAM structure allowed the movement to engage different constituents at different levels in the broader effort to isolate South Africa. The AAM’s national office was based in London, which was the centre of the movements decision making, where policies were devised, campaigns organised (such as Boycott Barclays or Free Nelson Mandela), and the high-level lobbying of politicians and business leaders occurred. The London office co-ordinated and directed much of the anti-apartheid campaigning across Britain.

The strength of the anti-apartheid cause in Britain was aided by an extensive network of local and regional AAM groups. Initially these structures existed only in larger urban areas, but by the 1980s, almost every British town and city had an AAM local group. The local groups were described by the AAM as ‘the basis and heart of the movement’. The British AAM created the overarching campaigns and policies to ensure a consistent anti-apartheid message, but it was the actions of the local groups that ensured they had nationwide coverage. As a result, anti-apartheid campaigns could be implemented in almost every locality, which intensified the visibility and impact. It also allowed the general public multiple opportunities to take individual actions against apartheid through local efforts such as picketing shops and venues. and boycotting products or organisations.

The local groups had a lot of freedom to act against any connections with the apartheid regime in their localities. There were many diverse links to South Africa, and a key role of the local groups was to identify them, and then direct their campaign efforts against them. There existed a huge variety and diversity in anti-apartheid campaigning across Britain, which reflected local economic, cultural, and social conditions.

== After apartheid ==
Mandela was released in February 1990, which started the negotiations to end apartheid in South Africa. For the Anti-Apartheid Movement, Nelson Mandela's release was a moment of celebration, but it also started an enormously challenging period in which they struggled to maintain the momentum of the 1980s, and sustain public interest in South Africa. Historians Matt Graham and Christopher Fevre have argued that South Africa's transition proved to be the most challenging period in the Anti-Apartheid Movement's existence due to a decline in public interest, a reduction of its membership base, questions about its long-term future as an organisation, a poor financial situation, and the difficulty of explaining the fast-paced negotiations and the political violence to the British public. The Anti-Apartheid Movement assisted the ANC's election campaign through fundraising, lobbying, and public rallies. These activities were part of the international support provided for the ANC's victory in South Africa's first democratic elections in April 1994.

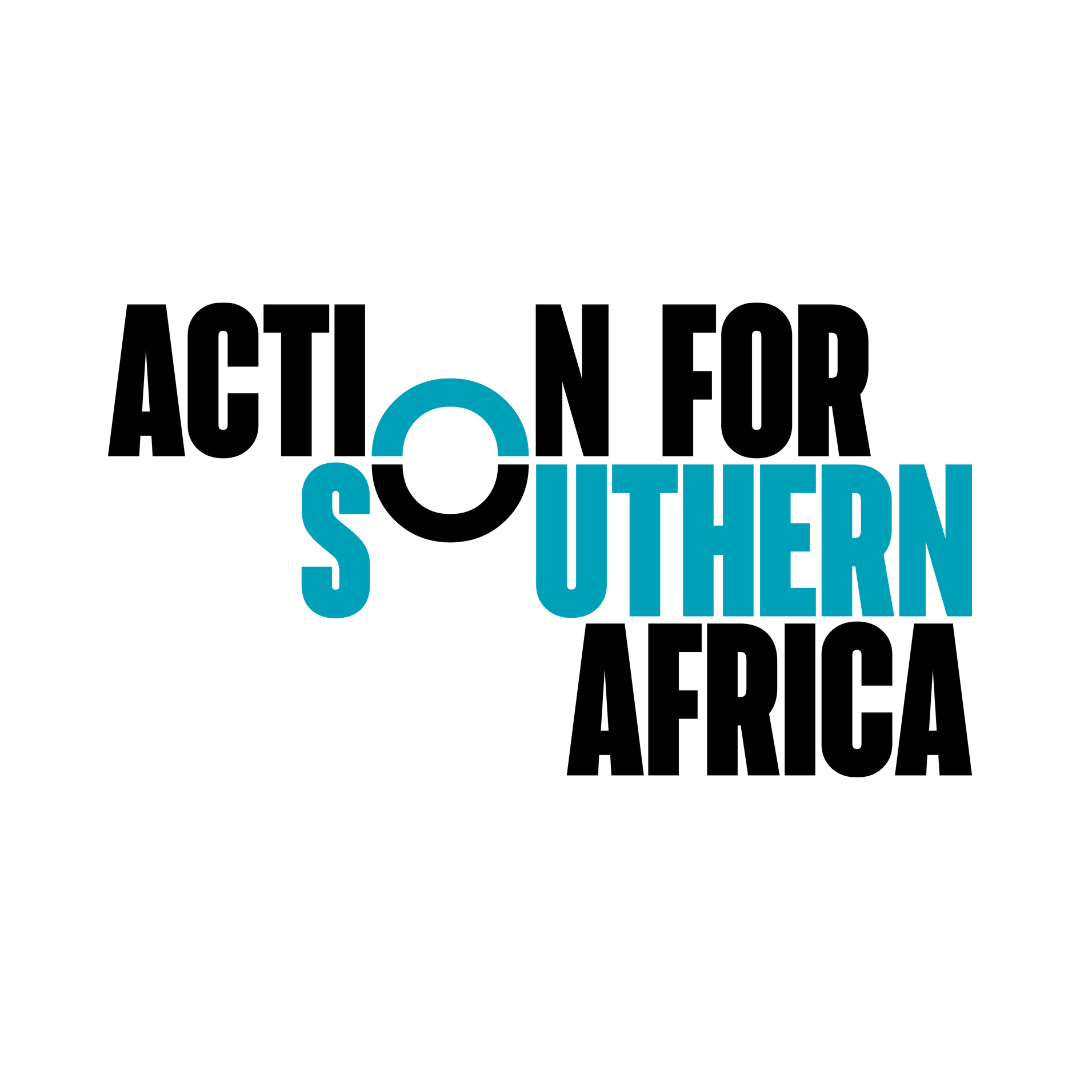
ACTSA logo

After the first democratic elections in South Africa, the AAM changed its name to ACTSA: Action for Southern Africa.

== See also ==
- Ros Ainslie
- Apartheid
- Disinvestment from South Africa
- International sanctions during apartheid
- Academic boycotts of South Africa
- Sporting boycott of South Africa during the apartheid era
- Hanef Bhamjee
- Paul Blomfield
- Michael C. Burgess
- Barbara Castle
- Ethel de Keyser
- Black Sash
- Free South Africa Movement
- Ruth First
- Ron Dellums
- John Diefenbaker - Prime Minister of Canada who succeeded in having South Africa expelled from the Commonwealth of Nations and further isolating the Apartheid regime
- David Ennals
- Trevor Huddleston
- Bob Hughes, Robert Hughes, Baron Hughes of Woodside
- Brian Mulroney - Prime Minister of Canada successfully enforced strict international economic sanctions against South Africa
- Harold Pinter
- Randall Robinson
- Leon Sullivan
- David Steel
- TransAfrica Forum
- United Democratic Front
- Anti-Apartheid movement in the United States
- Boycott, Divestment and Sanctions
