= Nomatemba Tambo =

British-South African diplomat and politician

Thembi Tambo
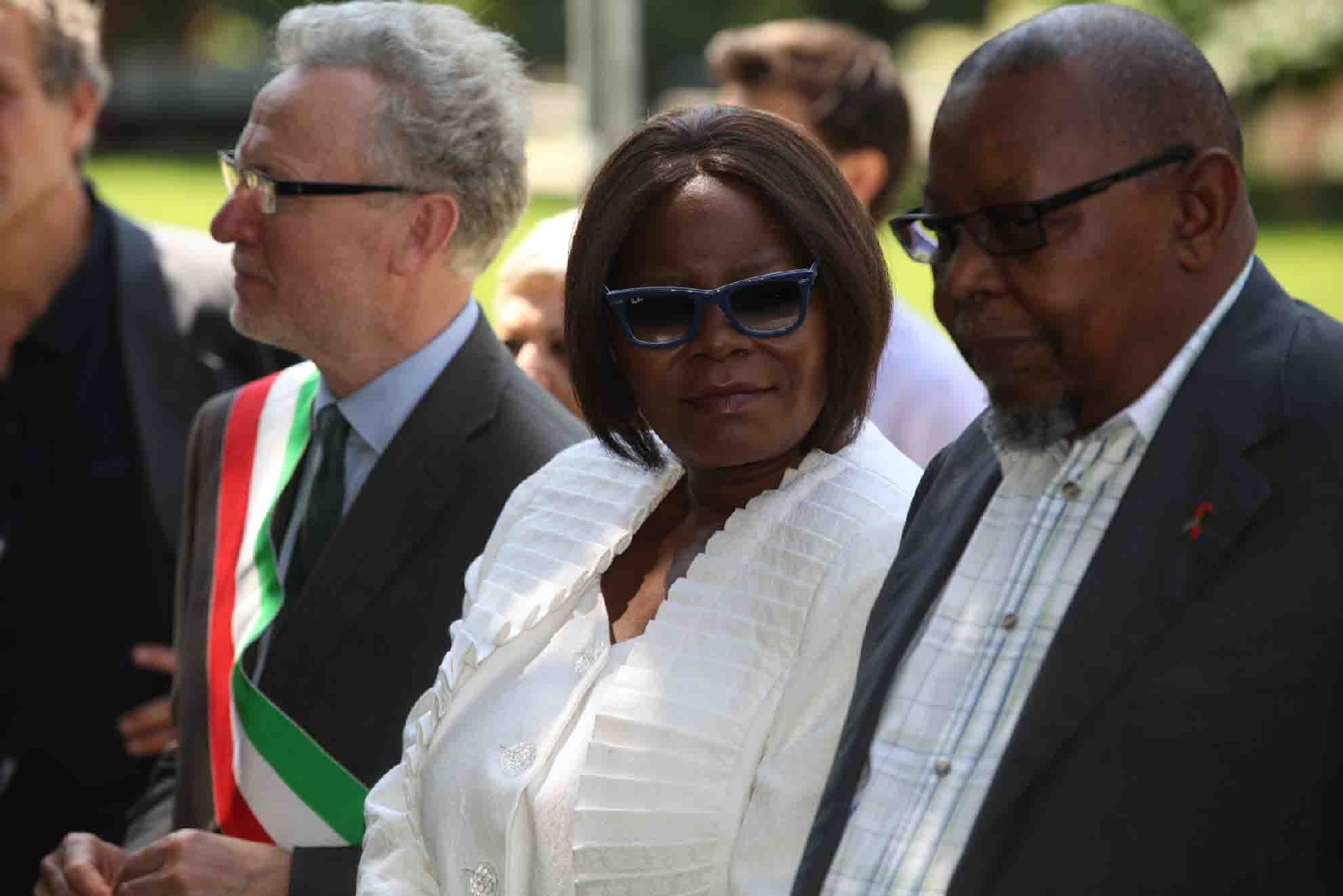
- Tambo (middle)

High Commissioner of South Africa to the United Kingdom
- In office March 2018 – 1 November 2022
- Succeeded by: Jeremiah Nyamane Mamabolo

Personal details
- Born: Nomatemba Gugulethu Pudnixia Olivia Tambo; 1957 (age 68–69)
- Citizenship: British; South African
- Education: University of Roehampton; University of the Witwatersrand
- Occupation: Diplomat, politician

Nomatemba Gugulethu Pudnixia Olivia Tambo (known as Thembi Tambo, born 1957) is a British-South African diplomat and politician, who was appointed High Commissioner of South Africa to the United Kingdom in March 2018. She was succeeded from 1 November 2022 by Jeremiah Nyamane Mamabolo.

== Education ==
Tambo has a BA in History and English at the University of Roehampton in London. This was followed by a law degree at University of the Witwatersrand in 2002. In 2007, she completed her diplomatic training.

== Career ==
Tambo was part of the Anti-Apartheid Movement.

== Personal life ==
Tambo is the daughter of Oliver Tambo. She attended the dedication of a statue to him in 2019.
