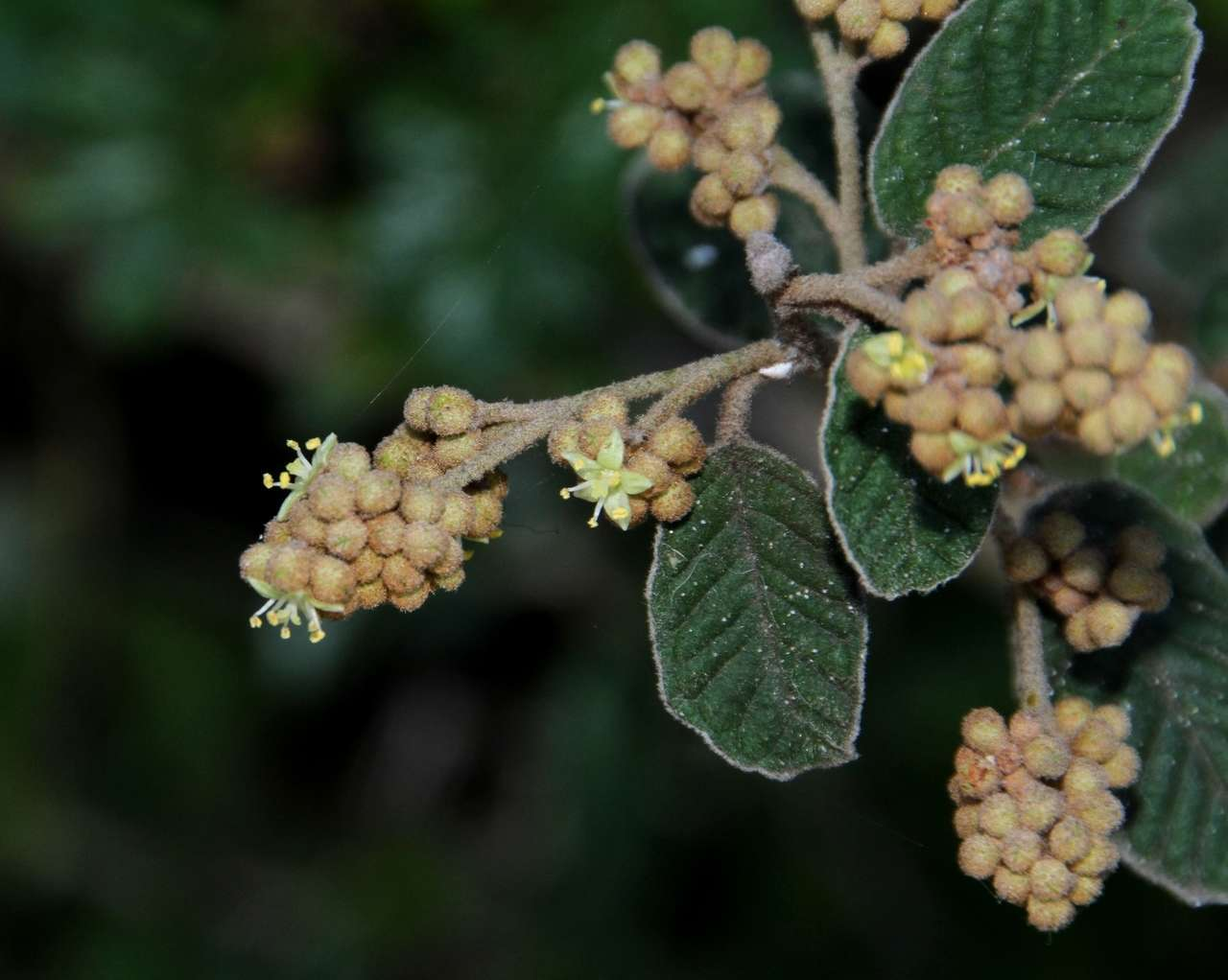
- At Wilsons Promontory

Scientific classification
- Kingdom: Plantae
- Clade: Tracheophytes
- Clade: Angiosperms
- Clade: Eudicots
- Clade: Rosids
- Order: Rosales
- Family: Rhamnaceae
- Genus: Pomaderris
- Species: P. oraria

Binomial name
- Pomaderris oraria F.Muell. ex Reissek

= Pomaderris oraria =

Species of shrub

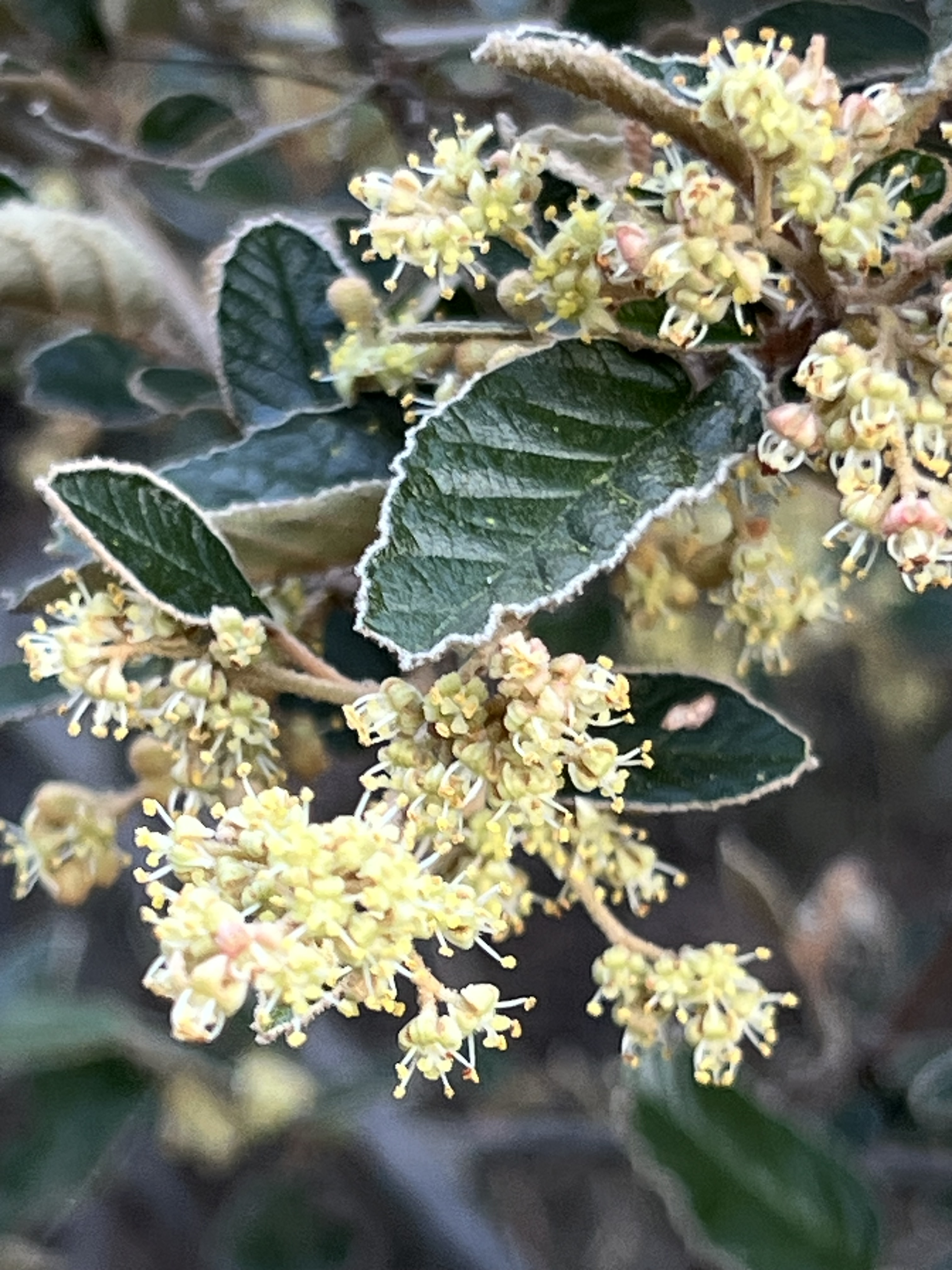
P. oraria subsp. oraria

Pomaderris oraria, commonly known as Bassian dogwood, is a species of flowering plant in the family Rhamnaceae and is endemic to south-eastern Australia. It is a compact shrub with hairy branchlets, hairy, elliptic leaves and panicles of hairy, greenish to cream-coloured or crimson-tinged flowers.

== Description ==
Pomaderris oraria is a compact shrub that typically grows to a height of up to 2 m (6 ft 7 in), and has many branchlets with soft greyish to rust-coloured, star-shaped hairs. The leaves are elliptic to egg-shaped, the size depending on subspecies, with densely hairy stipules about 2 mm (0.079 in) long at the base, but that fall off as the leaf develops. The upper surface of the leaves is covered with bristly or felt-like hairs, the lower surface densely covered with woolly white, star-shaped hairs. The flowers are borne on the ends of branchlets or in leaf axils in panicles about as long as the leaves, each flower on a pedicel 0.5–1.0 mm (0.020–0.039 in) long. The flowers are greenish to cream-coloured or tinged with crimson and densely covered with soft, star-shaped hairs. The size of the petal-like sepals varies with subspecies and there are no petals. Flowering occurs in October and November and the fruit is a dry capsule about 3 mm (0.12 in) long.

== Taxonomy ==
Pomaderris oraria was first formally described in 1858 by Siegfried Reissek in the journal Linnaea: Ein Journal für die Botanik in ihrem ganzen Umfange from an unpublished description by Ferdinand von Mueller. The type specimens were collected by Charles Stuart in Tasmania. The specific epithet (oraria) means "pertaining to the coast".

In 1990, Neville Grant Walsh described two subspecies of P. oraria in the journal Muelleria, and the names are accepted by the Australian Plant Census:

- Pomaderris oraria subsp. calcicola N.G.Walsh that has leaves up to 70 mm (2.8 in) long and sepals 2.0–2.5 mm (0.079–0.098 in) long and 1.2–1.5 mm (0.047–0.059 in) wide;
- Pomaderris oraria F.Muell. ex Reissek subsp. oraria that has leaves mostly 10–30 mm (0.39–1.18 in) long and sepals 1.5–2.2 mm (0.059–0.087 in) long and 1.0–1.3 mm (0.039–0.051 in) wide.

== Distribution and habitat ==
Subspecies oraria grows in near-coastal scrub in deep sand between Cape Paterson and Ninety Mile Beach in eastern Victoria and Badger Head and near Wingaroo on Flinders Island in Tasmania. Subspecies calcicola grows on limestone soils where it is often dominant in shrubland in a few locations in eastern Victoria including the Mitchell River National Park.

== Conservation status ==
Subspecies oraria is listed as "rare" under the Tasmanian Government Threatened Species Protection Act 1995.
