= Abdul Minty =

South African diplomat

Abdul Minty (otherwise known as Abdul Samad Minty) (born 31 October 1939) is a South African diplomat. He is currently ambassador of his country to the Board of Governors of the International Atomic Energy Agency (IAEA). He was a candidate for the succession of Mohammed ElBaradei as Director-General of the IAEA.

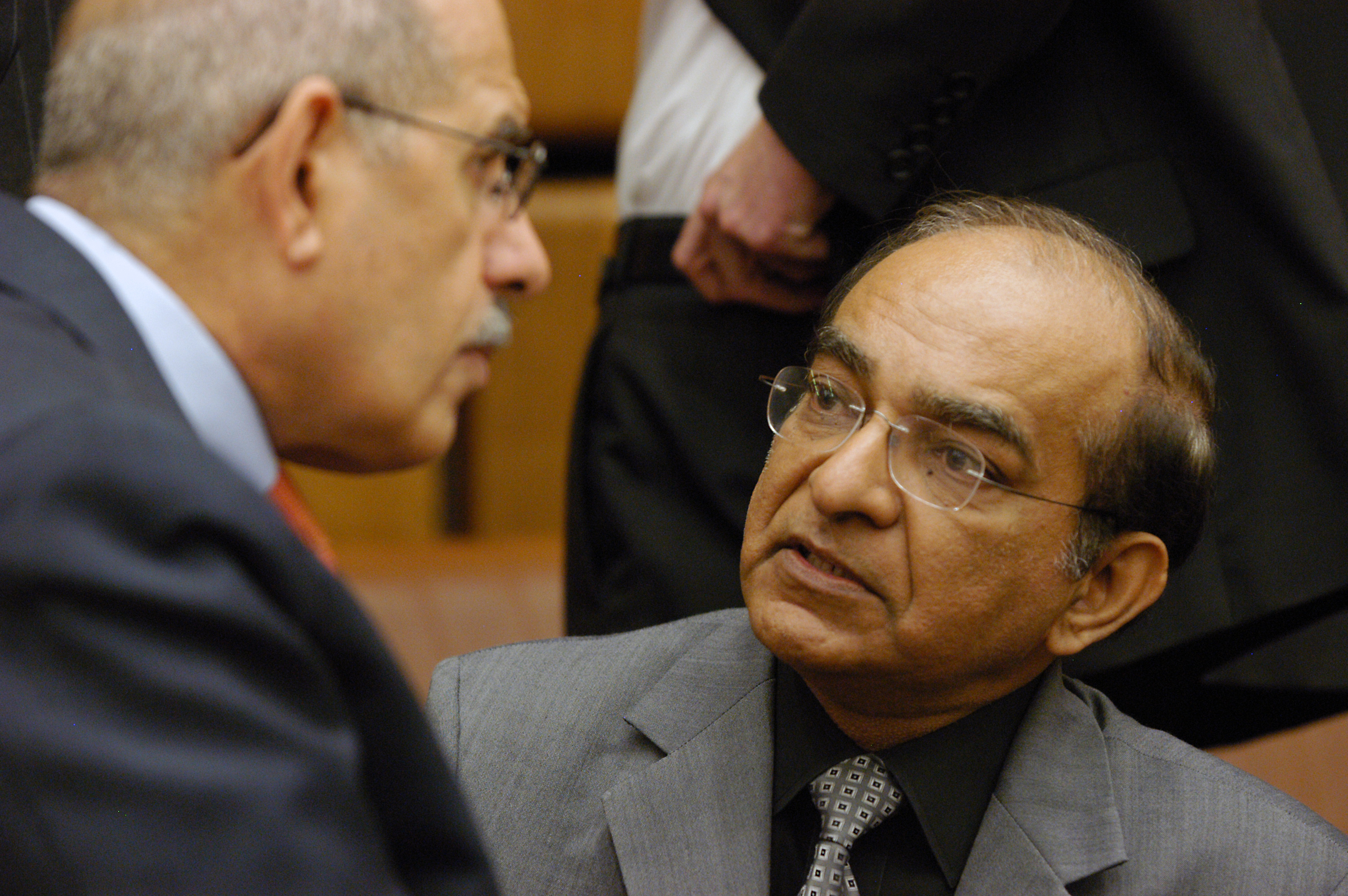
Minty (right) with Mohamed El Baradei, 2005

== Early life ==
Minty was born in Hartebeesfontein, South Africa. He grew up in Johannesburg but left the country for the UK in 1958.

== Working against apartheid ==
Minty presented the IOC 1962 material on racism in South African sports, which led in 1963 to exclude South Africa from the Olympic Games. Following his studies, he was a researcher at the Richardson Institute for Conflict and Peace Research in London from 1969 to 1975.

In 1979 he went to Norway to lead the "World Campaign against Military and Nuclear Cooperation with South Africa" in Oslo. This initiative was committed to respecting the 1977 arms embargo against South Africa and South Africa's (then only suspected) nuclear weapons program. Minty repeatedly raised these questions in the UN committees, such as the Special Committee against Apartheid, or the OAU . He was also a researcher at the International Peace Research Institute in Oslo during this time.

== After apartheid ==
Minty returned to South Africa in 1995. His experience and contacts were in demand in post-apartheid South Africa . He was Deputy Director-General of the South African Ministry of Foreign Affairs and Chairman of the WMD Non-Proliferation Council, which is responsible for export control of nuclear materials.

In 1995, he was also South Africa's ambassador to the IAEA Board of Governors in Vienna. Minty was committed to global nuclear disarmament, but also to the spread of peaceful nuclear technologies. In November 2008, South Africa's Minister of Mining and Energy, Patience, announced Sonjica Minty's candidacy for succeeding Mohammed el-Baradei, whose term ended on November 30, 2009, as IAEA Director-General. His candidacy was supported primarily by developing and emerging countries. After a first attempt to the election in March 2009 brought no decision, the Japanese Yukiya Amano prevailed on 2 July 2009 against Minty, when he reached the necessary two-thirds majority in the fourth ballot.

In April 2023 the University of Witwatersrand conferred on him an honorary doctorate.
