= Oliver Tambo =

South African anti-apartheid activist and politician (1917–1993)

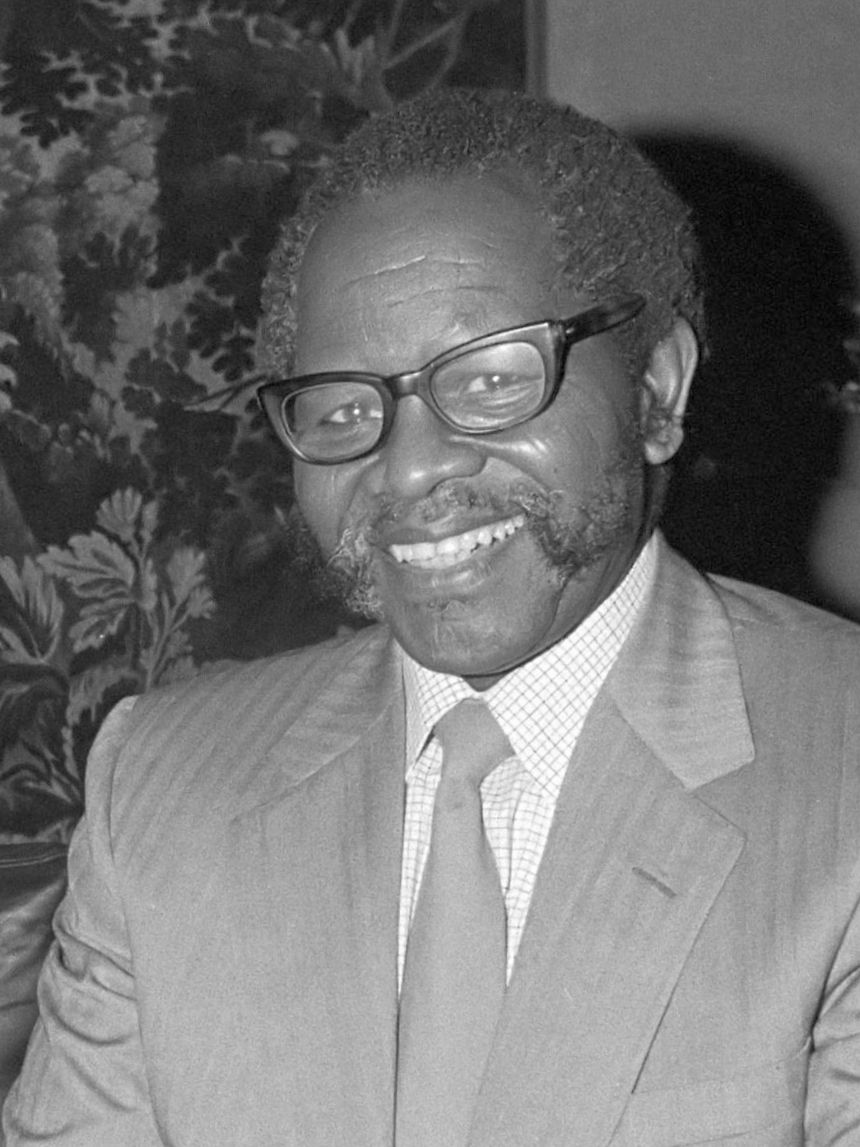
- Tambo in 1981

President of the African National Congress
- In office 21 July 1967 – 7 July 1991; Acting until May 1985
- Deputy: Nelson Mandela
- Preceded by: Albert Luthuli
- Succeeded by: Nelson Mandela

Deputy President of the African National Congress
- In office 1958–1985
- President: Albert Luthuli; Himself (acting)
- Preceded by: Nelson Mandela
- Succeeded by: Nelson Mandela

Secretary-General of the African National Congress
- In office 1955–1958
- President: Albert Luthuli
- Preceded by: Walter Sisulu
- Succeeded by: Duma Nokwe

National Chairperson of the African National Congress
- In office 7 July 1991 – 24 April 1993
- Preceded by: Position established
- Succeeded by: Thabo Mbeki

Personal details
- Born: Oliver Reginald Tambo; 27 October 1917 Nkantolo, South Africa
- Died: 24 April 1993 (aged 75) Johannesburg, South Africa
- Resting place: Benoni, Gauteng
- Party: African National Congress
- Other political affiliations: Tripartite Alliance
- Spouse: Adelaide Tshukudu (m. 1956)
- Children: 4, including Thembi and Dali
- Education: University of Fort Hare
- Occupation: Politician; revolutionary; teacher; lawyer; activist
- Known for: Anti-apartheid activism
- Awards: Order of Friendship of Peoples; Isitwalandwe Medal (1992)
- Nickname: OR Tambo

Oliver Reginald Kaizana Tambo (27 October 1917 – 24 April 1993) was a South African anti-apartheid politician, activist, and revolutionary who served as President of the African National Congress (ANC) from 1967 to 1991.

== Biography ==
=== Childhood ===
Oliver Tambo was born on 27 October 1917 in the village of Nkantolo about 20 kilometres from Bizana; eastern Pondoland in what is now the Eastern Cape. Pondoland, known for its rich, fertile land, was the last chiefdom in South Africa to remain independent; its annexation by the British in the late 19th century marked the final stage of colonial dispossession in the region. Most of the people in the village were farmers.

His father, Mzimeni Tambo, was the son of a farmer and an assistant salesperson at a local trading store. Mzimeni had four wives and ten children, all of whom were literate. Oliver's mother, Julia, was Mzimeni's third wife. Tambo's father was very aware of the British annexation, and expressed sentiment by naming Oliver,"Kaizana", after the German Kaiser Wilhelm II, Britains enemy during World War I.

=== Education ===
Oliver began his formal education at the age of seven at the Ludeke Methodist School, and completed his primary education at Holy Cross Mission. He later moved to Johannesburg where he attended St Peter’s College (present day St. Martin's School) in Rosettenville graduating in 1938 as one of the top students. Tambo initially wanted to study medicine but at the time, black students were not allowed to. He then opted to study sciences when he was admitted to the University of Fort Hare but in 1940 he, along with several others including Nelson Mandela, was expelled for participating in a student strike led by him in demand of a democratically elected students council. In 1942, Tambo returned to his former high school in Johannesburg to teach science and mathematics.Where he taught some future prominent figures like Duma Nokwe, first African Supreme Court advocate and later on went on to became the secretary-general of the ANC.

=== Youth League ===
In 1944, along with Nelson Mandela, and Walter Sisulu, Tambo founded the ANC Youth League, with Tambo becoming its first National Secretary and a member of the National Executive in 1948. The Youth League proposed a change in the tactics of the anti-apartheid movement. Previously, the ANC had sought to further its cause by actions such as petitions and demonstrations; the Youth League felt these actions were insufficient to achieve the group's goals and proposed their own "Program of Action". This program advocated tactics such as boycotts, civil disobedience, strikes, and non-collaboration.

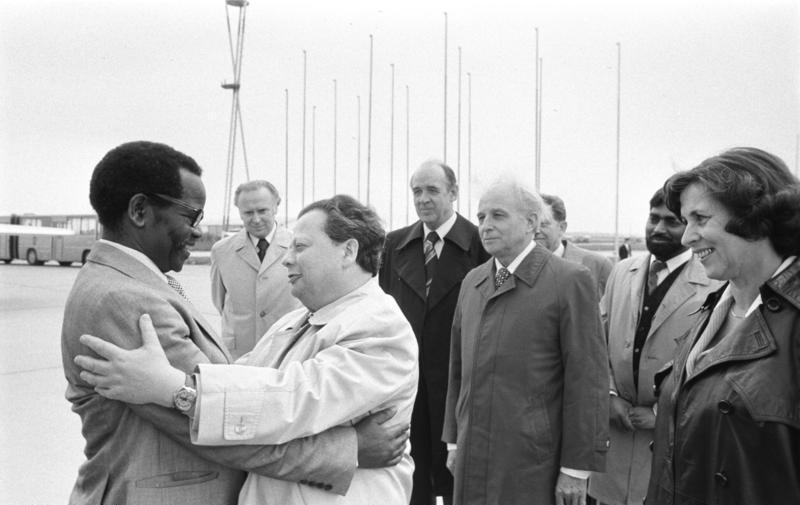
Tambo being greeted on arrival in East Germany (1978)

In 1955, Tambo became Secretary-general of the ANC after Sisulu was banned by the South African government under the Suppression of Communism Act. In 1958, he became Deputy President of the ANC and in 1959 was served with a five-year banning order by the government.

=== Exile to London ===
After the Sharpeville massacre on 21 March 1960 Tambo was sent abroad by the ANC to mobilize international opposition to apartheid. He crossed into Bechuanaland (now Botswana) and began what became known as the ANC's "Mission in exile," seeking diplomatic, political and financial support for the movement. Although he was banned and restricted to Johannesburg, he was still allowed to retain his leadership position in the ANC.

With assistance from figures such as Yusuf Dadoo and Frene Giwala, Tambo travelled across Africa, securing travel documents, and meeting with influential leaders like Julius Nyerere from Tanganyika(Tanzania), Kwame Nkrumah from Ghana and Gamal Abdel Nasser from Egypt, presenting ANCs case and seeking support. He settled with his family in Muswell Hill, north London, where he lived until 1990. His exile took a toll on him and not seeing his wife and three children, but his wife Adelaide supported the ANC at home by taking in ANC members arriving from the UK.

In 1967, following the death of Albert Luthuli. Tambo became acting president of the ANC. From exile, he sought to keep the ANC together and expand its international presence. Due to his skilful lobbying, he was able to attract new generation of talented South African exiles, one of them being Thabo Mbeki. As well as helping build global support for the anti- apartheid struggle

On 30 December 1979 in Lusaka, Zambia, Tambo, then acting president, and Alfred Nzo, then secretary-general of the ANC, met Tim Jenkin, Stephen Lee and Alex Moumbaris, ANC members and escapees from incarceration at Phillip Kgosi Prison as political prisoners. Their presence was officially announced by the ANC in early January and Tambo introduced them at a press conference on 2 January 1980.

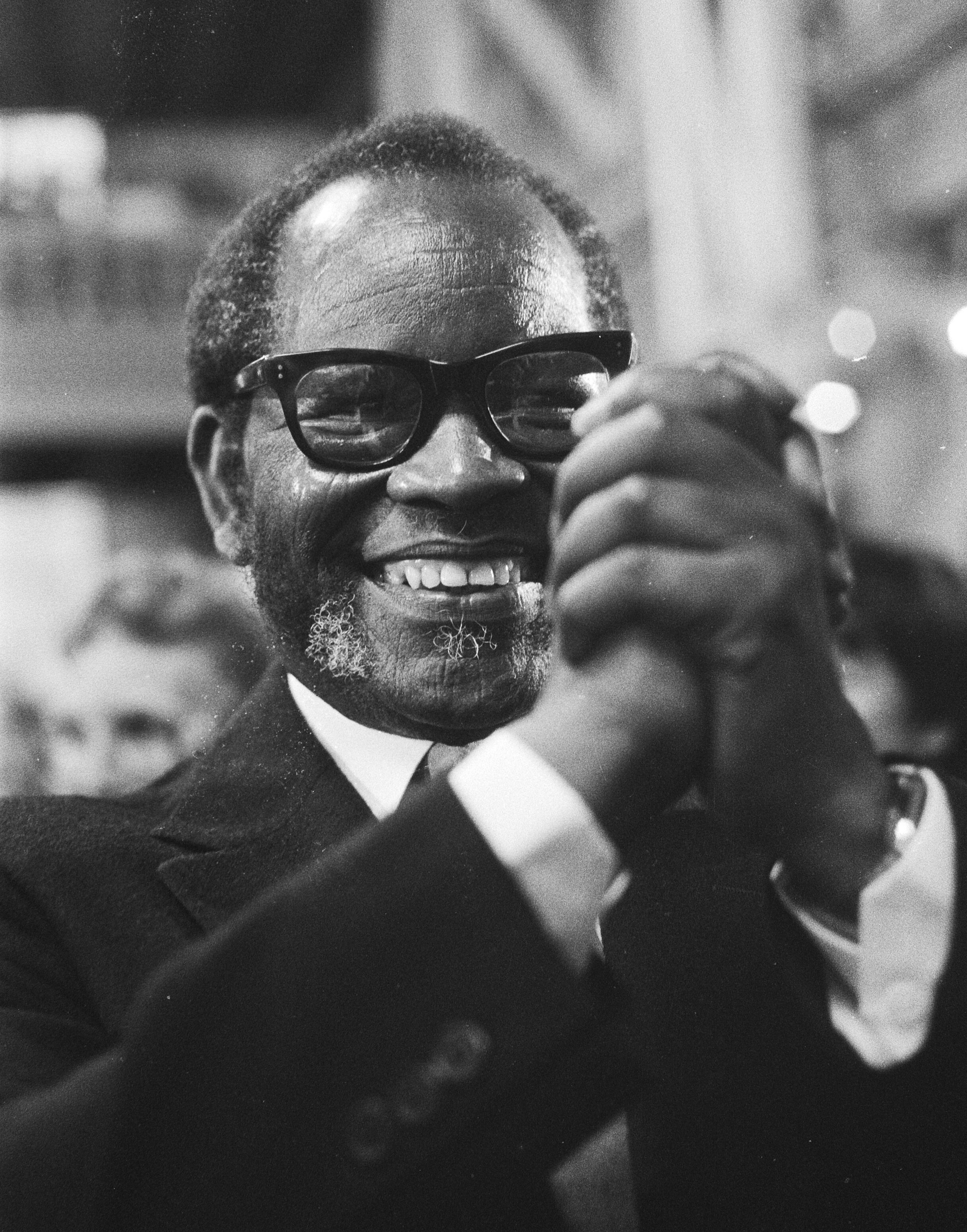
Oliver Tambo

=== Guerrilla activity ===
Tambo was directly responsible for organizing active guerrilla units. Along with his comrades, among whom were Nelson Mandela, Joe Slovo, and Walter Sisulu, Tambo directed and facilitated several attacks against the South African public. In an interview in 1985, Tambo was quoted as saying: "In the past, we were saying the ANC will not deliberately take innocent life, but now, looking at what is happening in South Africa, it is difficult to say civilians are not going to die."

The post-apartheid Truth and Reconciliation Commission (TRC) identified Tambo as the person who gave final approval, in between 1978 and 1979, for the 20 May 1983 Church Street bombing, which resulted in the death of 19 people and injuries to 197–217 people. The attack was orchestrated by a special operations unit of the ANC's Umkhonto we Sizwe (MK), commanded by Aboobaker Ismail. Such units had been authorized by Tambo as President of the ANC in 1979. At the time of the attack, they reported to Joe Slovo as chief of staff.

The ANC's submission said that the bombing was in response to a South African cross-border raid into Lesotho in December 1982 which killed 42 ANC supporters and civilians, and the assassination of Ruth First, an ANC activist and wife of Joe Slovo, in Maputo, Mozambique. It claimed that 11 of the casualties were SADF personnel and hence a military target. The legal representative of some of the victims argued that as they were administrative staff, including telephonists and typists, they could not be considered a legitimate military target.

Ten MK operatives, including Ismail, applied for amnesty for this and other bombings. The applications were opposed on various grounds, including that it was a terrorist attack disproportionate to the political motive. The TRC found that the number of civilians versus military personnel killed was unclear. South African Police statistics indicated that seven members of the SADF were killed. The commission found that at least 84 of the injured were SADF members or employees. Amnesty was granted by the TRC.

In 1985, he was re-elected President of the ANC. In October of that year, Tambo gave an important interview to the editor of the Cape Times newspaper, Tony Heard, in which he outlined the ANC's position and vision for a future, non-racial, South Africa. The interview was important for helping to create the political conditions for the South African government to later openly enter talks with the ANC thereby resulting in the CODESA negotiations that would start upon his return to South Africa.

=== Return to South Africa ===
He returned to South Africa on 13 December 1990 after over 30 years in exile. He was able to return to South Africa because of the legalization of the ANC. This was done by President F.W. de Klerk. When he returned after his time in exile he received much support. Some of that support even came from old rivals. However, because of his stroke in 1989, it was harder for him to fulfill his duties as President of the ANC, so in 1991, at the ANC's 48th National Conference, Nelson Mandela took over as president of the ANC. When he stepped down as president, however, the congress created a special position for him as the National Chairman.

=== Death ===
After suffering complications following a stroke, Tambo died on 24 April 1993, at the age of 75. His death came 14 days after Chris Hani's assassination and one year before the 1994 general election in which Nelson Mandela became President. Mandela, Thabo Mbeki, Walter Sisulu and other prominent politicians attended the funeral. Tambo was buried in Benoni, Gauteng.

== Personal life ==
As a child Tambo herded cattle starting at the age of 3. To support his education, he boarded with different families near school. He and his brother Alan enrolled in the Anglican Holy Cross school. Financial assistance from the Goddard family and one of Tambo's older brothers helped cover the costs of his schooling. He was baptised into the Anglican Church during this time.

At the Holy Cross school Tambo excelled academically and participated in athletics. His parents died within the time he was enrolled at Holy Cross, with both parents passing within a year of each other In 1936 Tambo passed in the Junior Certificate examination with a first-class pass, one of the first becoming one of the first African students in the Transvaal to achieve this distinction.

Tambo married Adelaide Tambo, a nurse and fellow anti-apartheid activist. They first met in 1946 at an ANC Youth league meeting. Adelaide converted to Anglicanism for Oliver.

== International relationships ==
The strong fight against apartheid brought Tambo to form a series of intense international relationships. In 1977, Tambo signed the first solidarity agreement between the ANC and a municipality: the Italian town of Reggio Emilia was the first city in the world to sign such a pact of solidarity. This was the beginning of a long understanding which brought Italy to put an effort into concrete actions to support the right of southern African people's self-determination; one of these actions was the organization of solidarity ships. The first one, called Amanda, departed from Genoa in 1980. It was Tambo himself who asked Reggio Emilia to mint Isitwalandwe Medals, the greatest of the ANC's honors.

== Honours ==
In 2004, he was voted number 31 in SABC3's Great South Africans, scoring lower than H. F. Verwoerd, before the SABC decided to cancel the final rounds of voting. The decision to cancel the results was largely informed by the fact that the majority of black South Africans did not participate in the voting, as SABC3 caters predominantly to English speakers.

In late 2005, ANC politicians announced plans to rename Johannesburg International Airport after him. Then-President Thabo Mbeki at this time did not side with this idea, and there was a behind-closed-doors meeting deliberating on this. Votes were in favour of the idea and against Mbeki and the proposal was accepted and the renaming ceremony occurred on 27 October 2006. The ANC-dominated government had previously renamed Jan Smuts Airport as Johannesburg International Airport in 1994 on the grounds that South African airports should not be named after political figures.

There is a sculpture of Tambo at the Albert Road Recreation Ground, Muswell Hill, close to his London home. In February 2021, Haringey Council renamed the park as the O.R. Tambo Recreation Ground. In June 2013, the city of Reggio Emilia in Italy celebrated Tambo with the creation of a park dedicated to the President of the African National Congress.

His house at 51 Alexandra Park Road, Muswell Hill, London, was purchased by the South African Government in 2010 as a historic monument and now bears a plaque.

Tambo's grave was declared a National Heritage site when he died but lost this status when his wife, Adelaide Tambo, died and was buried alongside him. However their grave was re-declared a National Heritage site in October 2012.

The ANC safe house in Lusaka, Zambia where Tambo spent much of his time in exile when not in London was declared a national monument by the Zambian Government in 2017, and opened to the public as Oliver Tambo Heritage House. It was opened by South African President Jacob Zuma, Zambian President Edgar Lungu and former Zambian President Kenneth Kaunda.

To conclude the centenary celebrations of the birth of Tambo, a commemoration was held at Regina Mundi Catholic Church in Moroka, Soweto on 27 October 2017. This same event marked also the centenary of the sinking of the troopship SS Mendi. The event was curated by Ambassador Lindiwe Mabuza and Fr Lawrence Mduduzi Ndlovu, together with the Thabo Mbeki Foundation and the Oliver and Adelaide Tambo Foundation.

== Books ==
- Tambo, O., & Reddy, E. S. (1987). Oliver Tambo and the Struggle against Apartheid, New Delhi: Sterling Publishers, in collaboration with the Namedia Foundation.
- Tambo, Oliver & Tambo, Adelaide (1988). Preparing for Power: Oliver Tambo Speaks, New York: G. Braziller, ©1987.
- Tambo, O., & Reddy, E. S. (1991). Oliver Tambo, Apartheid and the International Community: Addresses to United Nations Committees and Conferences, New Delhi: Namedia Foundation: Sterling Publishers.

== See also ==
- List of people subject to banning orders under apartheid
