= List of publications by The Women's Press =

These books published over a 25-year period demonstrate the achievements of The Women's Press (1977-2003): a small publisher based in London with global reach, radical in the innovation of its commissioning, the courage of its writers, its intersectional politics, and the energy of its brand identity and marketing. Many key writers, including Alice Walker, May Sarton and Lucy Goodison, stayed with the Press for decades. Doris Lessing said of it in 1998: "I admire The Women's Press which has consistently taken risks and been enterprising and brave."

This is a partial list of significant publications by The Women's Press.

== Sexual/Race/Peace Politics ==
Title	Author	Year	Notes	Ref
About Men	Phyllis Chesler	1979		ISBN 0704338319
Gyn/Ecology: The Metaethics of Radical Feminism	Mary Daly	1979		ISBN 0704328291
The Dialectic of Sex: The Case for Feminist Revolution	Shulamith Firestone	1980		ISBN 0704338491
Learning to Lose: Sexism and Education	Dale Spender & Elizabeth Sarah (eds.)	1980		ISBN 0704338637
The Transsexual Empire: The Making of the She-Male	Janice Raymond	1980		ISBN 0704338572
Pornography: Men Possessing Women	Andrea Dworkin	1981		ISBN 0704338769
Pornography and Silence	Susan Griffin	1981		ISBN 0704338777
Feminist Theorists: Three Centuries of Women's Intellectual Traditions	Dale Spender editor	1983		ISBN 0704338890
Right-Wing Women: The Politics of Domesticated Females	Andrea Dworkin	1983		ISBN 0704339072
Reclaim the Earth: Women Speak Out for Life on Earth	Leonie Caldecott & Stephanie Leland (eds.)	1983		ISBN 0704339080
Woman and Nature: The Roaring Inside Her	Susan Griffin	1984		ISBN 0704339331
Greenham Common: Women at the Wire	Barbara Harford & Sarah Hopkins (eds.)	1984		ISBN 0704339269
Call Me Woman	Ellen Kuzwayo	1985	Preface by Nadine Gordimer, Foreword by Bessie Head	ISBN 0704328488
No Immediate Danger: Prognosis for a Radioactive Earth	Rosalie Bertell	1985		ISBN 0704328461
For the Record: The Making and Meaning of Feminist Knowledge	Dale Spender	1985		ISBN 0704339609
Surpassing the Love of Men: Romantic Friendship and Love Between Women from the Renaissance to the Present	Lillian Faderman	1985		ISBN 0704339773
The Rocking of the Cradle and the Ruling of the World	Dorothy Dinnerstein	1987		ISBN 0704340275
Desperate Spring: Lives of Algerian Women	Fettouma Touati	1987	Translated by Ros Schwartz	ISBN 0704340534
The Rocking of the Cradle and the Ruling of the World	Dorothy Dinnerstein	1987	New introduction by Vivien Bar	ISBN 0704340275
Moroccan Women Speak	Fatima Mernissi	1988	Translated by Mary Jo Lakeland	ISBN 0704340887
Rape of the Wild	Andrée Collard with Joyce Contrucci	1988	Foreword by Mary Daly	ISBN 0704340976
Olive Schreiner: A Biography	Ruth First and Ann Scott	1989		ISBN 0704341565
Maternal Thinking: Towards a Politics of Peace	Sara Ruddick	1990		ISBN 0704342375
Sit Down and Listen: Stories from South Africa	Ellen Kuzwayo	1990		ISBN 0704342308
Angela Davis: An Autobiography	Angela Davis	1990		ISBN 070434209X
Invisible Women: The Schooling Scandal	Dale Spender	1989		ISBN 0704341468
Women, Culture and Politics	Angela Davis	1990		ISBN 0704342162
Anticlimax: A Feminist Perspective on the Sexual Revolution	Sheila Jeffreys	1990		ISBN 0704342030
To My Children's Children: A South African Autobiography	Sindiwe Magona	1991		ISBN 0704342847
Living, Loving and Lying Awake at Night	Sindiwe Magona	1992		ISBN 0704343215
New Age and Armageddon: The Goddess or the Gurus? Towards a Feminist Vision of the Future	Monica Sjöö	1992		ISBN 0704342634
Diana, Princess of Wales: How Sexual Politics Shook the Monarchy	Beatrix Campbell	1998		ISBN 0704345854
Beyond Sex and Romance? The Politics of Contemporary Lesbian Fiction	Elaine Hutton (ed.)	1998		ISBN 0704345374
Overloaded: Popular Culture and the Future of Feminism	Imelda Whelehan	2000		ISBN 0704346176
Planet Earth: The Latest Weapon of War	Rosalie Bertell	2002		ISBN 0704344289

== Cultural/Literary/Art Studies ==
Title	Author	Year	Notes	Ref
Aurora Leigh and Other Poems	Elizabeth Barrett Browning	1978	Introduced by Cora Kaplan	ISBN 0704338203
The Awakening	Kate Chopin	1978	Introduced by Helen Taylor	ISBN 070433822X
Women Artists: Recognition and Reappraisals from the Early Middle Ages to the Twentieth Century	Karen Petersen and J. J. Wilson	1978		ISBN 0704338262
Literary Women	Ellen Moers	1978		ISBN 0704338254
Working Women Artists Calendar		1979, 1980, 1981		
The World Split Open: Women Poets 1552-1950	Edited and Introduced by Louise Bernikow	1979		ISBN 0704338327
Women & Writing	Virginia Woolf	1979	Introduced by Michèle Barrett	ISBN 0704338394
The Opoponax	Monique Wittig	1979		ISBN 0704338459
Les Guérillères	Monique Wittig	1979		ISBN 0704338467
Break of Day	Colette	1979		ISBN 0704338424
Paula Modersohn-Becker: Her Life and Work	Gillian Perry	1979		ISBN 0704338432
Portraits	Kate Chopin	1979	Short Stories Selected & Introduced by Helen Taylor	ISBN 0704338440
Alberta & Jacob	Cora Sandel	1980		ISBN 0704338580
Alberta and Freedom	Cora Sandel	1980		ISBN 0704338599
Alberta Alone	Cora Sandel	1980		ISBN 0704338602
A Good Man Is Hard to Find and Other Stories	Flannery O’Connor	1980	Introduced by Lisa Alther	ISBN 070433853X
The Charlotte Perkins Gilman Reader: ‘The Yellow Wallpaper’ and Other Fiction	Charlotte Perkins Gilman	1981	Edited and Introduced by Ann J. Lane	ISBN 0704338661
The Dragon's Village: An Autobiographical Novel of Revolutionary China	Yuan-tsung Chen	1981		ISBN 0704338653
Rediscovery: 300 Years of Stories By and About Women	Betzy Dinesen editor	1981		ISBN 0704338793
The Handbook of Non-Sexist Writing for Writers, Editors & Speakers	Casey Miller & Kate Swift	1981	Revised British Edition, Stephanie Dowrick (ed.)	ISBN 0704338785
Through the Flower: My Struggle as a Woman Artist	Judy Chicago	1982		ISBN 0704338939
The Subversive Stitch: Embroidery and the Making of the Feminine	Rozsika Parker	1983		ISBN 0704328429
In Search of Our Mothers' Gardens: Womanist Prose	Alice Walker	1984		ISBN 0704328453
How to Suppress Women's Writing	Joanna Russ	1984		ISBN 0704339323
No Holds Barred: The Raving Beauties Choose New Poems by Women	The Raving Beauties (Sue Mayo, Angela Barlow, and Frances Viner)	1985)		ISBN 0704339633
Feminist Aesthetics	Gisela Ecker (ed.)	1985		ISBN 0704339641
Hypatia's Heritage: A History of Women in Science	Margaret Alice	1986		ISBN 0704339544
Fat Like the Sun	Anna Swir	1986		ISBN 0704340151
The Evening Star: Recollections	Colette	1987	Introduction by Alison Hennegan	ISBN 0704340445
Victorian Women Artists	Pamela Gerrish Nunn	1987		ISBN 0704340348
Stealing the Language: The Emergence of Women's Poetry in America	Alicia Suskin Ostriker	1987		ISBN 0704340437
Glancing Fires: An Investigation Into Women's Creativity	Lesley Saunders editor	1987		ISBN 0704340615
Out of Focus: Writing on Women and the Media	Kath Davies, Julienne Dickey & Teresa Stratford (eds)	1987		ISBN 0704340593
Dear Girl: The diaries and letters of two working women (1897-1917)	Tierl Thompson (ed.)	1987		ISBN 0704340267
Living By the Word: Selected Writings 1973-1987	Alice Walker	1988		ISBN 0704341530
The Female Gaze: Women as Viewers of Popular Culture	Lorraine Gamman & Margaret Marshment (eds.)	1988		ISBN 0704341093
Writing a Woman's Life	Carolyn G. Heilbrun	1989		ISBN 0704341840
Gender and Genius: Towards a New Feminist Aesthetics	Christine Battersby	1989		ISBN 0704350394
Delighting the Heart: A Notebook by Women Writers	Susan Sellers (ed.)	1989		ISBN 0704341670
A Mountainous Journey: A Poet's Autobiography	Fadwa Tuqan	1990	Translated from the Arabic by Olive Kenny, Introduction by Dr Salma Jayyusi	ISBN 0704350564
Potters and Paintresses: Women Designers in the Pottery Industry 1870-1955	Cheryl Buckley	1990		ISBN 0704342111
Hamlet's Mother and Other Women: Feminist Essays on Literature	Carolyn G Heilbrun	1991		ISBN 0704342731
Taking Reality by Surprise: Writing for Pleasure and Publication	Susan Sellers (ed.)	1991		ISBN 0704342677
Her Blue Body Everything We Know: Earthling Poems 1965-1990 Complete	Alice Walker	1991		ISBN 0704350610
Mama Said There'd Be Days Like This: My Life in the Jazz World	Val Wilmer	1991		ISBN 0704341204
What Lesbians Do in Books: Essays on Lesbian Sensibilities in Literature	Elaine Hobby & Chris White (eds.)	1991		ISBN 070434288X
A Journey into the Red Eye: The Poetry of Sylvia Plath – A Critique	Janice Markey	1993		ISBN 0704343169
Emily Brontë: Heretic	Stevie Davies	1994		ISBN 0704344017
The Complete Stories	Alice Walker	1995		ISBN 0704344351
The Orchard	Drusilla Modjeska	1995		ISBN 0704345145
May Sarton: Selected Letters 1916-1954	May Sarton	1997	Edited and Introduced by Susan Sherman	ISBN 0704345358
After the Stroke	May Sarton	1997		ISBN 0704345331
The Bridge of Years	May Sarton	1997		ISBN 0704345536
Deep Sightings and Rescue Missions	Toni Cade Bambara	1997		ISBN 0704345234
Anything We Love Can Be Saved: A Writer's Activism	Alice Walker	1997		ISBN 070434548X
Bone Black: Memories of Girlhood	bell hooks	1997		ISBN 0704345501
The Same River Twice: Honoring the Difficult	Alice Walker	1998		ISBN 0704345730
Wounds of Passion: A Writing Life	bell hooks	1998		ISBN 0704345838
Bittersweet: Contemporary Black Women's Poetry	Karen McCarthy (ed.)	1998		ISBN 0704346079
Ms-Directing Shakespeare: Women Direct Shakespeare	Elizabeth Schafer	1998		ISBN 0704345447
Cecilia Bartoli: The Passion of Song	Kim Chernin with Renate Stendhal	1998		ISBN 0704350815
Unbridled Spirits: Women of the English Revolution 1640-1660	Stevie Davies	1998		ISBN 0704344890
Remembered Rapture: The Writer at Work	bell hooks	1999		ISBN 0704346273
A Career in Crime: Inside Information from Leading Women Writers	Helen Windrath (ed.)	1999		ISBN 0704346125
All About Love: New Visions	bell hooks	2000		ISBN 0704346648
The Janet Frame Reader	Carole Ferrier (ed.)	2000		ISBN 0704344343
Salvation: Black People and Love	bell hooks	2001		ISBN 0704347202
Carson McCullers: A Life	Josyane Savigneau	2001		ISBN 0704350866

== Psychology/Mental health/Wellbeing ==
Title	Author	Year	Notes	Ref
Female Cycles	Paula Weideger	1979		ISBN 0704338297
Why Children?	Stephanie Dowrick & Sibyl Grundberg (eds.)	1980		ISBN 0704338556
The Moon and the Virgin: Reflections on the Archetypal Feminine	Nor Hall	1980		ISBN 0704338629
Other Mothers’ Daughters	Judith Arcana	1981		ISBN 0704338645
In Our Own Hands: A Book of Self-Help Therapy	Sheila Ernst and Lucy Goodison	1981		ISBN 0704338416
Flowers of Emptiness	Sally Belfrage	1981		ISBN 0704338750
The Words to Say It	Marie Cardinal	1981	Translated by Pat Goodheart	ISBN 0704346680
Lone Thoughts from a Broad	Paula Youens	1981		ISBN 0704338815
Womansize: The Tyranny of Slenderness	Kim Chernin	1983		ISBN 0704339145
Sex and Love: New Thoughts on Old Contradictions	Sue Cartledge and Joanna Ryan (eds.)	1983		ISBN 0704339137
Every Mother's Son: The Role of Mothers in the Making of Men	Judith Arcana	1983		ISBN 0704339161
Living with the Sphinx: Papers from the Women's Therapy Centre	Sheila Ernst & Marie Maguire (eds.)	1987		ISBN 0704340259
The Knot of Time: Astrology and the Female Experience	Lindsay River and Sally Gillespie	1987		ISBN 0704339129
The Mother Machine	Gena Corea	1987	Reproductive Technologies from Artificial Insemination to Artificial Wombs	ISBN 0704340798
Beauty Secrets: Women and the Politics of Appearance	Wendy Chapkis	1988		ISBN 0704340895
Moving Heaven and Earth: Sexuality, Spirituality and Social Change	Lucy Goodison	1990		ISBN 0704350386
Devotion and Disorder: A Story of Addiction, Obsession and Maternal Love	Marie Cardinal	1991	Translated by Karin Montin	ISBN 0704342472
Past Due: A Story of Disability, Pregnancy and Birth	Anne Finger	1991		ISBN 070434291X
Pride Against Prejudice: Transforming Attitudes to Disability	Jenny Morris	1991		ISBN 0704342863
Generation Games: Genetic Engineering and the Future of Our Lives	Pat Spallone	1991		ISBN 0704342707
As Far As the Eye Can Sing	Frankie Armstrong with Jenny Pearson	1992	An autobiography of Frankie Armstrong	ISBN 0704342944
Intimacy & Solitude: Balancing Closeness and Independence	Stephanie Dowrick	1992		ISBN 0704347547
The Intimacy & Solitude Self-Therapy Book	Stephanie Dowrick	1993		ISBN 0704343770
Women Healers Through History	Elizabeth Brooke	1993		ISBN 070434324X
The Dreams of Women: Exploring and Interpreting Women's Dreams	Lucy Goodison	1995		ISBN 0704343959
Forgiveness & Other Acts of Love: Finding True Value in Your Life	Stephanie Dowrick	1998		ISBN 0704345773
Well-Tuned Women: Growing Strong Through Voicework	Frankie Armstrong and Jenny Pearson (eds.),	2000		ISBN 0704346494

== Fiction/Memoir ==
Title	Author	Year	Notes	Ref
Lolly Willowes	Sylvia Townsend Warner	1978		ISBN 0704338246
Love & Friendship & Other Early Works	Jane Austen	1978		ISBN 0704338238
The Albatross Muff	Barbara Hanrahan	1978		ISBN 0704338270
The Pearl Bastard	Lillian Halegua	1978		ISBN 0704338289
A Piece of the Night	Michèle Roberts	1979		ISBN 0704338300
Shedding	Verena Stefan	1979		ISBN 0704338343
Duo & Le Toutounier	Colette	1979	First time in paperback	ISBN 0704338351
Woman on the Edge of Time	Marge Piercy	1979		ISBN 0704338378
The High Cost of Living	Marge Piercy	1979		ISBN 070433836X
Herland	Charlotte Perkins Gilman	1979		ISBN 0704338408
Hard Feelings: Fiction & Poetry from Spare Rib	Alison Fell (ed.)	1979		ISBN 0704338386
Sister Gin	June Arnold	1979		ISBN 0704338335
Patience & Sarah	Isabel Miller	1979		ISBN 0704338483
Faces in the Water	Janet Frame	1980		ISBN 0704338610
Gaining Ground	Joan Barfoot	1980	Published in Canada as Abba	ISBN 0704338521
Vida	Marge Piercy	1980		ISBN 0704338513
Original Sins	Lisa Alther	1981		ISBN 0704328399
Living in the Maniototo	Janet Frame	1981	Winner of the Fiction Prize, New Zealand Book Awards, 1980	ISBN 070433867X
The Girl	Meridel Le Sueur	1982		ISBN 0704338807
Scented Gardens for the Blind	Janet Frame	1982		ISBN 0704338998
Nothing To Do With Love	Joyce Reiser Kornblatt	1982		ISBN 0704338912
The Color Purple	Alice Walker	1983	Winner of the Pulitzer Prize for Fiction 1983	ISBN 0704339056
To the Is-Land: An Autobiography	Janet Frame	1983	Winner of the James Wattie Book of the Year Award, New Zealand, 1983	ISBN 0704328410
The Visitation	Michèle Roberts	1983		ISBN 070433903X
As We Are Now	May Sarton	1983		ISBN 0704339218
Gorilla, My Love	Toni Cade Bambara	1984		ISBN 0704339277
Daughters of Copper Women	Anne Cameron	1984		ISBN 0704339463
Sinking, Stealing	Jan Clausen	1985		ISBN 0704339536
A Humming Under My Feet: A Book of Travail	Barbara Deming	1985		ISBN 0704339528
One Thing Leading to Another	Sylvia Townsend Warner	1985		ISBN 0704339552
Owls Do Cry	Janet Frame	1985		ISBN 0704339587
The Unbelonging	Joan Riley	1985		ISBN 0704328615
Horses Make a Landscape Look More Beautiful	Alice Walker	1985		ISBN 0704339625
Journal of a Solitude	May Sarton	1985		ISBN 0704339692
Requiem	Shizuko Gō	1985	Translated by Geraldine Harcourt	ISBN 0704328631
The Third Life of Grange Copeland	Alice Walker	1985		ISBN 0704339854
The Envoy from Mirror City: Autobiography 3	Janet Frame	1985		ISBN 0704328755
Duet for Three	Joan Barfoot	1986		ISBN 0704328720
The Magnificent Spinster	May Sarton	1986		ISBN 0704350041
Child of Fortune	Yūko Tsushima	1986	Translated by Geraldine Harcourt	ISBN 0704350181
Waiting in the Twilight	Joan Riley	1987		ISBN 0704350114
Boy Blue	Stevie Davies	1987		ISBN 0704340313
Potiki	Patricia Grace	1987	Co-winner of the 1986 Wattie Book of the Year Award	ISBN 070434081X
Report for Murder	Val McDermid	1987		ISBN 0704340801
Death Comes Staccato	Gillian Slovo	1987		ISBN 0704340550
Angel	Merle Collins	1987		ISBN 0704340828
A Wicked Old Woman	Ravinder Randhawa	1987		ISBN 0704350327
Good Night, Willie Lee, Ill See You in the Morning	Alice Walker	1987		ISBN 0704340631
The Silken Thread	Cora Sandel	1988		ISBN 0704340860
Amritvela	Leena Dhingra	1988		ISBN 0704341131
Nervous Conditions	Tsitsi Dangarembga	1988		ISBN 070434100X
Romance	Joan Riley	1988		ISBN 0704341018
My Life Story: The Autobiography of a Berber Woman	Fadhma Amrouche	1988	Translated with an Introduction by Dorothy Blair	ISBN 0704340933
Glory Day	Rosie Scott	1989		ISBN 0704341867
Primavera	Stevie Davies	1990	Winner of The Fawcett Society Prize 1989	ISBN 0704350483
She Came in a Flash	Mary Wings	1988		ISBN 0704341085
The Red Box	Farhana Sheikh	1991		ISBN 070434260X
Changes: A Love Story	Ama Ata Aidoo	1991	Winner of the Commonwealth Writers Prize for Best Book, African region	ISBN 0704342618
Final Edition	Val McDermid	1991		ISBN 0704345935
Siege of Azadi Square	Manny Shirazi	1991		ISBN 0704342642
An Apple from a Tree	Margaret Elphinstone	1991		ISBN 0704342812
Motherlands: Black Women's Writing from Africa, the Caribbean and South Africa	Susheila Nasta editor	1991		ISBN 0704342693
Fire! Fire!	Caeia March	1991		ISBN 0704342820
Cold Steal	Carole Spearin McCauley	1991		ISBN 0704342901
Divine Victim	Mary Wings	1992	Winner of the Lambda Literary Award for Lesbian Mystery 1994	ISBN 0704343231
The Pocket Mirror	Janet Frame	1992		ISBN 0704343312
Charlotte and Claudia Keeping in Touch	Joan Barfoot	1994		ISBN 0704344106
Between the Worlds	Caeia March	1996		ISBN 0704344718
Bone Black: Memories of Girlhood	bell hooks	1997		ISBN 0704345501
Booked for Murder	Val McDermid	1997		ISBN 0704345951
Some Things About Flying	Joan Barfoot	1997		ISBN 0704345498
In Another Place, Not Here	Dionne Brand	1997		ISBN 0704345609
Tasting Salt	Stephanie Dowrick	1998		ISBN 0704345544
By the Light of My Father's Smile	Alice Walker	1998		ISBN 0704350831
Janet Frame: The Complete Autobiography	Janet Frame	1998		ISBN 0704350726
Leaning Towards Infinity	Sue Woolfe	1998		ISBN 070434582X
The Priest Fainted	Catherine Temma Davidson	1998		ISBN 0704346060
While Other People Sleep	Marcia Muller	1998		ISBN 0704346141
Baby No-eye	Patricia Grace	1999		ISBN 0704346168
Dark Inheritance	Elaine Feinstein	2000		ISBN 0704346710
Those Bones Are Not My Child	Toni Cade Bambara	2000		ISBN 0704346540
The Fishcastle	Elizabeth Stead	2002		ISBN 0704347032
Wild Ginger	Anchee Min	2002		ISBN 0704347466
Critical Injuries	Joan Barfoot	2002		ISBN 0704347520
Four Dreamers and Emily	Stevie Davies	2002		ISBN 0704344688
Kinship Theory	Hester Kaplan	2002		ISBN 0704347210

== Science Fiction ==
Between 1983 and 1990 The Women's Press published a series of feminist science fiction. Edited by Sarah LeFanu these were originally distinctive with their pocket size, and grey spines. From 1988 they were integrated into the main line with its distinctive black and white livery. Although not a commercial success, their influence on British science fiction writers was significant, at a time when female science fiction writers struggled to be published. In the Chinks of the World Machine, Sarah LeFanu (1988) remains a highly significant critical work.

A full list of sf titles published by The Women's Press can be found on the Internet Science Fiction Database.

Title	Author	Year	Notes	Ref
Native Tongue	Suzette Haden Elgin	1985		ISBN 0704339714
The Wanderground	Sally Miller Gearhart	1985		ISBN 0704339471
Accommodation Offered	Anna Livia	1985	Original publication	ISBN 0704328577
Memoirs of a Spacewoman	Naomi Mitchison	1985		ISBN 0704339706
Extra(ordinary) People	Joanna Russ	1985	Story collection	ISBN 0704339501
The Adventures of Alyx	Joanna Russ	1985	Story collection	ISBN 0704339722
The Female Man	Joanna Russ	1985		ISBN 0704339498
The Two of Them	Joanna Russ	1986		ISBN 0704340356
Star Rider	Doris Piserchia	1987		ISBN 0704340712
We Who Are About To...	Joanna Russ	1987		ISBN 0704340852
A Door Into Ocean	Joan Slonczewski	1987		ISBN 0704340690
A Spaceship Built of Stone	Lisa Tuttle	1987	Story collection; original publication	ISBN 0704340844
Kindred	Octavia Butler	1988		ISBN 070434162X
The Judas Rose	Suzette Haden Elgin	1988		ISBN 0704340984
Walk to the End of the World and Motherlines	Suzy McKee Charnas	1989	Omnibus edition; original publication	ISBN 0704341549
In the Chinks of the World Machine: Feminism and Science Fiction	Sarah LeFanu	1988	Non-fiction collection	ISBN 0704340925
The Language of the Night	Ursula K Le Guin	1989	Non-fiction collection	ISBN 0704342022
Women as Demons	Tanith Lee	1989	Story collection; original publication	ISBN 0704341328
The Hidden Side of the Moon	Joanna Russ	1989	Story collection	ISBN 0704341859
Skin of the Soul: New Horror Stories by Women	Lisa Tuttle ed.	1990	Story anthology	ISBN 0704342200
