= The Women's Press =

UK feminist publishing company (1977–2003)

The Women's Press Ltd
- Parent company: Namara Group Ltd
- Status: Feminist publishing house
- Traded as: The Women's Press
- Founded: 1977
- Founder: Stephanie Dowrick & Naim Attallah
- Defunct: 2003
- Country of origin: United Kingdom
- Headquarters location: London
- Distribution: Quartet Books Ltd
- Key people: Stephanie Dowrick, Donna Muir (designer), Suzanne Perkins (designer), Ros de Lanerolle, Mary Hemming, Kathy Gale
- Publication types: Books, plus multi media, art calendars, art diaries, postcards
- Nonfiction topics: Sexual politics, race justice, cultural history, art history, literary studies, psychology and mental health, environment, peace making, sexuality, fiction
- Fiction genres: writing by women
- Imprints: The Women's Press; The Women's Press Bookclub; Livewire
- Revenue: From book sales, also subsidiary and foreign rights sales
- Owners: Jointly owned by Dowrick and Attallah until 2002
- No. of employees: Never more than 12 full and p/time at any one time
- Official website: thewomenspress.com

The Women's Press was a feminist publishing company established in London in 1977. Throughout the late 1970s, the 1980s and the 1990s, The Women's Press was a highly visible presence, publishing feminist literature.

== Founding ==
In 1977, 28-year-old New Zealand-born "rising star" publisher Stephanie Dowrick founded The Women's Press in London with personal support from feminists active in the women's liberation movement (WLM) and with financial support from literary entrepreneur Naim Attallah. He guaranteed the press's launch overdraft on the basis of Dowrick's previous commercial and literary publishing experience.

Attallah, via the Namara Group, eventually owned the Literary Review and already owned Quartet Books, which had previously partnered with Virago Press. "Stephanie was [Editorial Manager] with Triad Paperbacks when…Quartet asked her if she would like to do some books for them. She declined but…Attallah, head of the group that includes Quartet Books, suggested that she set up a separate company."

"Dowrick arrived in Europe at the age of 20 and, after a series of odd jobs in London and Berlin returned to London. She then entered book publishing, and [after her start at George Harrap], in quick succession, became managing editor of New English Library and then editorial manager of Triad Paperbacks [Cape, Chatto and the Bodley Head, together with Granada Publishing]."

This high level experience with major trade publishers encouraged Dowrick to attract to The Women's Press potentially high-profile writers challenging the status quo. Dowrick's conviction was that "[t]here was space for a new feminist publishing house that would reflect one of the most exciting political currents in society and make commercial sense." As Attallah recalled, "It was set up with a hundred £1 shares, with me holding fifty-three percent and Stephanie the balance of forty-seven per cent [...] to begin with Stephanie was the only full-time employee and the whole operation was started in her living-room in her house in Bow."

Attallah defended his support of Dowrick's overtly feminist publishing stating that "women's liberation is for everyone” and "no one in their right mind would oppose it". The financing had to depend on commercial acumen. "It didn't cost a lot initially because I worked in my home for no wages and then for very low wages." Dowrick worked as the sole full-timer until 1979. "We...pay ourselves modest wages and are responsible for what and how we publish, and for eventual solvency."

The logo of The Women's Press was an iron, a play on the symbol of unthanked domestic labour associated with women, with black and white stripes running down the books' spines to represent an iron's electric cord. The multi-media designing for brand identity was done by Canadian artist/designer Donna Muir. The wit and skill of Muir's distinctive work extended to posters, badges, postcards, stationary and especially to the spines and prelims of the books at a time when overt multi-media brand recognition was in its infancy.

Through the close association of Dowrick with therapists and writers from the Women's Therapy Centre, TWP explicitly embraced the slogan "the personal is political", and vice versa. Dowrick was joined part-time by Sibyl Grundberg, and in February 1978 The Women's Press issued its first five books, including Lolly Willowes by Sylvia Townsend Warner and a reprint of Jane Austen's Love and Freindship (sic). Other reprints in the 1978 list included Elizabeth Barrett Browning's Aurora Leigh and Other Poems with a "dazzling" introduction by Cora Kaplan and the first British publication of Kate Chopin's The Awakening. The Women's Press emphasised contemporary works over classics and understood itself as raising consciousness and making effective contributions to women of all cultures and classes over a range of areas.

By 1979/1980, its publishing programme included non-fiction titles on sexual and race politics, physical and mental health, environmental and peace politics, art history, aesthetics, gender studies and many other disciplines. It operated with minimal staff during its first five years, and a small informal advisory group of feminist academics and media workers. Suzanne Perkins worked on the covers and although part-time and working from home, became a company director. All the cover artists were women. The aim was to commission and enable genuinely intersectional writing that could support women of varied cultural backgrounds, and would challenge the status quo wherever it limited women's sense of agency and possibility, while meeting commercial realities and publishing excellence.

In 1979, the Press moved from Dowrick's home in Bow, East London, to offices in Shoreditch, East London, developing links to similarly innovative feminist publishers in Europe, including Sara (the Netherlands), Frauenoffensive 1974-2016 (Germany), Les Editions des Femmes (France), as well as expanding distribution in Australia and New Zealand.

In 1980, Dowrick established The Women's Press Book Club as a revenue stream for TWP and to benefit TWP authors via direct sales to committed readers. The Book Club allowed members to order several books a month, some published by TWP, others bought in.

In 1981–2, TWP benefitted as a new publisher from selling UK and ANZ paperback rights to Penguin in Kinflicks author Lisa Alther's follow-up novel, Original Sins, and from selling foreign rights in non-fiction titles. By the end of 1981, Dowrick reported that in four years, "…we have achieved more than I thought possible. People no longer question our role, and our books are seriously reviewed."

Dowrick was an active TWP Director 1977-1985, mentoring de Lanerolle through 1982-4, then from 1991 to 2000 was Chair of the TWP board. In 1981, she was the first winner of the Pandora Award given by the UK group, Women in Publishing, "For the best contribution to the positive image of women".

== Sexual Politics ==
"What we learned and practised [at The Women's Press] was this. One group of human beings cannot determine the value of other human beings' lives without reducing us all. I do not think I fully understood as a younger woman that the power of feminism, race justice, gay, environmental and peace politics calls for a new understanding of what it means to be human. That's what liberation means: liberation from the utterly false proposition that some lives intrinsically matter more than others."

Its politics were aimed at interrogating the gender, social, racial and economic status quo locally and globally, especially as these affected women and children. This was explicitly intersectional: “From climate disasters hitting hardest in the poorest communities, to a sharp rise in racism and discrimination, to the spread of online misogyny and anti-rights rhetoric – it's clear that equality is still out of reach for too many. The world can feel overwhelming and stacked with overlapping injustices. So how do we make sense of it all and how do we fight back? Intersectional feminism offers a way in. It helps us understand how different types of inequality – like racism, sexism, ableism, and classism – don’t just exist side by side but often collide and compound."

In 1977, as it prepared to publish, Dowrick wrote: "The Women's Press reflects one of the most exciting continuing changes in society this [20th] century: the progress of women towards a position of equality. We are not only asking for the same rights as men, we are also actively reassessing the society in which we are to play an equal part. We are examining history to find our place there and, while demanding power, are questioning where the distortions of power lie. The Women's Press is a new voice of this change."

This is echoed by social historian Sheila Rowbotham: "We must ask ourselves equality with what? Do men have such idyllic lives that we want the same for ourselves? In a world where people are valued as economic units rather than as people, to be an equal economic unit should not be the height of our ambition."

Of The Women's Press and the women's liberation movement more generally, Dowrick said: "We understood there'd be no human rights without race and gender justice. We understood that exploiting people or the planet was a violence that we could not tolerate. We were anything but quiet."

"You have to act as if it were possible to radically transform the world. And you have to do it all the time." (Angela Davis, The Women’s Press author, 1982)

“Be prepared to be enlightened, enraged, amused, engaged, and above all provoked.” (Beatrix Campbell, The Women’s Press author,1998)

No uniformity of feminist analysis was demanded from writers. "Feminism isn't sacred. It isn't a religion. (We should be free to question all aspects of it.)" Carmen Calill, founder of Virago, The Guardian (UK), 6 June 1990. Radical feminists, including from the US, were published alongside socialist feminist writers, largely though not exclusively British, European, New Zealanders. Black feminism was explicitly intersectional, strong from the earliest times and developed through the 1980s and 1990s despite the rise of racism in Britain with the election of Margaret Thatcher, intensifying from 1981.

Gender politics were not minimised. Across art, literary and cultural history, it published work that challenged assumptions about women's capacities and achievements. "Traditional" caring roles were well understood. "We live in an intensely sexist society which denigrates women publicly and makes it very difficult for them to be a mother, while at the same time sentimentalising the idea of motherhood. The archetype of the mother is one who makes up for all the cruelty, competitiveness and hostility in the outside world – and remains unaffected by it."

Through each of three major phases of its history, the emphasis changed with leadership priorities. "Feminism is not a monolith. Like any large political or social movement, powered by passion and coloured by the real life experiences of multitudes of women, it has its internal schisms, divisions, factions and splits."

== 1977–1990s ==
Under Dowrick's leadership The Women's Press differentiated itself from Virago Press, by emphasising contemporary political concerns, using the slogan "Live Authors, Live Issues". Also through brand identity, and publishing leading US radical feminist writers as well as those from Britain, Europe, New Zealand and Australia.

Dowrick commissioned a number of prominent British or British-based writers to create original work. They included Gillian Perry, Sally Belfrage, Rozsika Parker, Joanna Ryan and Sue Cartledge, Lucy Goodison and Sheila Ernst, Lindsay River and Sally Gillespie, Leonie Caldecott and Stephanie Leland, Dale Spender, Frankie Armstrong, and Sibyl Grundberg. She also commissioned Helen Taylor's introduction to the first British publication of Kate Chopin's The Awakening, Cora Kaplan's introduction to Elizabeth Barrett Browning's Aurora Leigh, and Michèle Barrett to write Virginia Woolf: Women and Writing which remains in print. Rosalind Delmar wrote the introduction to the first British edition of The Dialectic of Sex. Dowrick edited the first British edition of A Handbook of Non-Sexist Writing by Casey Miller and Kate Swift.

From her native New Zealand, Dowrick published among others Janet Frame, Patricia Grace, and later Sandi Hall. She published many of the leading US feminist writers of the day, including Judith Arcana, Nor Hall, Andrea Dworkin, Phyllis Chesler, Shulamith Firestone, Louise Berkinow, and Susan Griffin. Early fiction and memoir writers included Alice Walker (USA), Toni Cade Bambara (USA), May Sarton (USA), Lisa Alther (USA), Joyce Kornblatt (USA), Marge Piercy (USA), Sylvia Townsend Warner (UK), Colette (France), Joan Barfoot (Canada), Monique Wittig (France), Meridel Le Sueur (USA), Yuan Tsung-Chen (China), Cora Sandel (Norway), Charlotte Perkins Gilman (USA), (USA), Drusilla Modjeska (UK/Australia), and Michèle Roberts (UK).

The Women's Press published some books in collaboration with feminist magazine, Spare Rib, starting with Hard Feelings in 1979 (edited by Alison Fell). It also collaborated with Frauenoffensive, Munich, publishing Verena Stefan, Shedding, and with Sara, Amsterdam by publishing Anja Meulenbelt's The Shame is Over.

In 1982, Ros de Lanerolle became managing director of the company. In 1983, the Press had commercial success with the British publication of Alice Walker's bestseller The Color Purple, later made into a movie by Steven Spielberg. Two earlier books by Walker, Meridian and You Can't Keep a Good Woman Down, were contracted by Dowrick in 1981, buying British rights from literary agency David Higham & Co. Dowrick had previously published Toni Cade Bambara's earlier novel, The Salt Eaters to be followed by Seabirds are Still Alive (1984).

In 1983, Stephanie Dowrick left London to live in Australia while remaining an active Director of The Women's Press until 1985. She became Chair of The Women's Press Ltd in 1991.

From 1982 to 1985, Dowrick as Director and founder was in regular contact with de Lanerolle on a variety of TWP management/editorial issues, as well as The Women's Press Bookclub. Between December 1981 and October 1982, writers contracted by de Lanerolle: Barbara Wilson (USA), Sheila Ortiz Taylor (Mexican/American), Jill Miller (UK), Sheelagh Kanelli (UK/Greece), Dorothy Bryant (USA), Moira Duff (Scotland/Canada). During the mid-1980s, de Lanerolle contracted authors including Stevie Davies (Wales), Angela Davis (USA), Ellen Kuzwayo (South Africa), Fettouma Touati (Algeria), Joan Riley (Jamaica/UK), Tsitsi Dangarembga's Nervous Conditions (1988), Shizuko Gō (Japan), Anna Swir (Poland), Rosie Scott (New Zealand), Sue Woolfe (Australia), and Pauline Melville.

In addition to the diverse categories established from 1978, through the 1980s and the 1990s, The Press published a crime list including books by Mary Wings, Marcia Muller and introducing "Queen of Crime" Val McDermid. From 1985 to 1991, it also had a feminist science fiction list, edited by critic Sarah LeFanu. The SF list remains contentious. With some exceptions, including Joanna Russ and Octavia Butler, plus Marge Piercy, Monique Wittig and Charlotte Perkins Gilman earlier published as literary titles, the SF list could not be justified as a distinct list beyond the period of "organisational crisis" The SF project failed despite "the discursive means through which workers [TWP staff] marketed and edited texts toward their core feminist audience and dedicated science fiction fans [and]…the selection practices involved in constituting the list—recovery, transatlantic reissue, original publication and criticism—which, in turn, acted to define the genre for new audiences."

In all but subsidised publishing houses, the sales potential of each title has to be paramount in the organisation's "selection practices" both to reward the writer and to ensure organisation solvency. "The Women’s Press was [to be] funded by book sales, as well as, to a lesser extent, foreign and subsidiary rights sales."

== De Lanerolle, Miriam Books and Open Letters ==
By the early 1990s, a publishing recession left The Women's Press making losses between £105,000 and £300,000, the exact figures are disputed. The most reliable profit/loss figures come from a report prepared by the Namara Group company secretary for The Women's Press at June 1992 for the year ending June 1991: TWP loss (£96,873); TWP Bookclub profit £3205; interest costs, £41,584. (1985–1988 profit/loss figures are also available.) The difference between this annual loss and the figure of £300,000 previously quoted is likely because the £300,000 appears to represent cumulative losses at this time. However, The Women's Press had by 1992 been in loss for three years and losses cumulatively were £344,086 (£998,000 equivalent in 2026).

According to an article in The Guardian by David Pallister, de Lanerolle argued that the cause was a general recession and that the company was recovering, but that Attallah believed the growing focus on Third World women writers was financially risky and that he wished to interfere in the editorial autonomy of TWP. The editorial "interference" narrative was strongly disputed by both Attallah and Dowrick. As is the "cause" of the losses (staff and production costs far outrunning the return on book sales).

The controversy around the TWP management crisis itself became racist in its attacks on Palestinian-born Attallah as backer of Dowrick's feminist press ("the Ayatollah", "Attallah-Disgusting") Such attacks were not new. "In some eyes, Attallah the publisher is not what the French would call un type sérieux."

Dowrick had established TWP with Attallah’s confidence that she could combine effective sexual politics with publishing and business acumen.

"He and I liked each other because he's very enthusiastic, and I’m rather enthusiastic too. So, we decided we would go into business together and it was in some ways so incongruous and so successful because he never ever tried to interfere with the running of The Women's Press. It was perfectly clear to him from the outset that if this publishing house was to be a women's press, it would be utterly absurd for a man to be interfering in that way. He backed the finances by guaranteeing an overdraft."

Between early 1982 and 1985, Dowrick had continued to mentor de Lanerolle on management, financial and editorial matters, overseeing the professional well-being of the 23 authors Dowrick had contracted between December 1981 until June 1982, then Dowrick's previously published authors beyond 1982, including Alice Walker, Lucy Goodison, Michèle Roberts, and many others.

Widespread media repeats of the "interference by Attallah" narrative led to claims of disloyalty (to de Lanerolle) against staff who remained at TWP, repeated also in later accounts. "In late 1990, in a move that provoked widespread opposition from de Lanerolle's supporters within the firm, Attallah appointed sales director Mary Hemming (a staff member more sympathetic to the owner's plans for the press) to the position of deputy managing director."

While still TWP managing director, in November 1990 de Lanerolle sought advice from business consultant Robert Oakeshott on a detailed proposal for a feminist publishing venture, Miriam Books, named for Miriam Tlali, the first black woman to publish a novel in South Africa. In the proposal sent to Oakshott de Lanerolle wrote, "It is to be marketed as much on its European identity as its women's identity".

Proposing Miriam Books, de Lanerolle wrote: "The Women's Press faces decline if not demise (sic), owing to problems developing out of its company structure, and, in addition, will be further weakened by the attracting of some of its key staff to Miriam Books." It is not known who those "key staff" were. TWP would continue to publish successfully until 2002.

Later commentators positioned the crisis as a "feminist" struggle against a constricting "corporate structure", ignoring the threat to the survival of The Women's Press while backers were being (unsuccessfully) sought for Miriam Books. "What the affair [the 1991 crisis] highlights starkly for alternative publishing is the impotence of editors to set their own publishing agendas if they lack financial clout within a press's corporate structure, and the corresponding power of unsympathetic owners effectively to gag writing that they deem unprofitable, and hence to deny it public exposure."

This commentary highlights a lack of understanding among academic observers of trade publishing that is professionally competent and ethically sound in its care of authors. "It's not enough to say I publish books I like, though that has to be part of it…a bankrupt publishing house could advance no cause."

"What was really at stake was the survival of The Women's Press [after three years of financial losses] as a viable and influential feminist house at a time when the publishing industry is suffering redundancies and unparalleled financial problems. Those who indulge in moralizing do not usually assume the financial burden, and this case is no exception. But I shall ensure that the ideals which were at the core of The Women's Press when it was founded [by Dowrick] will remain intact. The going might be tough, but the determination is tougher."

In March 1991 media reported that Attallah had rejected an attempted buyout offer of £500,000 by de Lanerolle. No evidence is forthcoming. No books were published under the Miriam Books imprint. De Lanerolle rejected an offer from Attallah to stay on as Chief Editor in return for relinquishing the post of Managing Director. De Lanerolle accepted a redundancy payout and five other staff resigned in solidarity with her. Attallah appointed himself the firm's interim managing director and Dowrick returned for some time from Australia before they together appointed Kathy Gale first as publishing director, soon after as joint managing director with Mary Hemming.

Twenty-three Women's Press authors, including Merle Collins, Michèle Roberts, Gillian Slovo and Sheila Jeffreys, wrote to The Guardian to distance themselves from Attallah's perceived actions. In the period that followed her resignation, de Lanerolle moved on to a new company, Open Letters, the press release announcing it was "aiming at originality and diversity" with Alison Hennegan and Gillian Hanscombe as co-directors. The launch was to be in June 1992. A catalogue was prepared to announce "Europe's newest independent women's publisher'".

The financial "clout" and structural freedom sought by de Lanerolle was not supported by potential backers for Miriam Books, or for Open Letters.

The clash of idealism with commercial realities led to the demise of Open Letters by 10 November 1992, when a letter to shareholders revealed, "Despite our best efforts during the summer and autumn to secure the company's finances we have reached a position where the burden of debt carried by the company can no longer be sustained…We have decided we must cease trading, with immediate effect."

A period of recovery followed that gave TWP a further 13 years of largely successful publishing.

== TWP recovery and revival 1991–2002 ==
A period of recovery and growth for TWP followed the 1991 crisis. What was set in train by the new professionalism under the publishing leadership of Kathy Gale (1991-1999) gave TWP a further 12 years of successful publishing.

"According to Attallah, not only was the publishing house haemorrhaging financially, it had divided along sectional lines between those who want you to concentrate on Third World and African authors, and those who wanted to maintain the more traditional policy of publishing feminist voices from both the First and Third Worlds. With the British media feasting on the spectacle of infighting amongst feminists, Attallah called Dowrick in to help, which she did. [Dowrick says] …'I went in and appointed a new publishing director and tried to support the women who remained.'"

In 1991 Kathy Gale, who had been an Editorial Director at Pan Macmillan, a Senior Commissioning Editor at Hodder & Stoughton (now Hachette), and Managing Editor at the radical publisher Pluto Press, was appointed as publishing director. In a draft press release prior to Gale taking up her role on 17 June 1991, Dowrick described Gale's appointment as "Marking a new and extremely positive phase in the life of the press, The Women's Press will continue to publish with the integrity which has been its hallmark, but I believe Kathy Gale will bring with her a necessary commercial expertise as well as a keen awareness of a variety of issues of immediate social concern, appropriate to the success of a women's publishing house in the 1990s."

Despite the ongoing economic recession and drawing on that "necessary commercial expertise", Gale brought TWP back into financial balance within six months. Jennifer Bradshaw and Nina Kidron (co-founder of Pluto Press) were appointed to the Board. Sales Director, Mary Hemming, was appointed as co-MD with Kathy Gale.

"Workaholic" Gale has described her responsibilities in the face of the financial near-collapse she inherited: "From the time of my appointment in June 1991, it was key for me to ensure that The Women's Press was financially secure. That was the basis on which I was appointed by Stephanie Dowrick and the [TWP] Board, and the future of the Press was at stake. It was an urgent task at the time to put rigorous focus on profitability on both a title-by-title basis, and on the company as a whole."

Gale brought to her role high-level publishing experience that allowed the TWP "radical edge" to flourish.

1990s publications included recent work from May Sarton, Stevie Davies, Angela Davis, Patricia Grace, Marie Cardinal, Val McDermid, Joan Barfoot, and new writers Dionne Brand, bel hooks, Beatrix Campbell, Sue Woolfe, Gerrilyn Smith, Joan Ryan, Beth Yahp, Drusilla Modjeska, Lois Keith, Jenny Morris, Stephanie Dowrick (publishing four books over this decade with TWP, alongside separate ANZ and US editions), Caeia March, Kim Chernin (with a feminist biography of singer Cecilia Bartoli), and Octavia Butler as one of the more successful literary/SF writers.

A widespread revamp of covers and marketing, including for the most popular authors like Alice Walker and Marcia Muller, as well as Mary Wings and Val McDermid, increased visibility and sales in high street bookshops. Outgoings were reduced with more work done by experienced staff in-house. Specialist catalogues for black and Asian writers brought those writers crucial new readers.

In 1998, Dowrick discussed her "inspirational aims" for The Women's Press. She hoped that "The existence of the Press would promote a freer, bolder, and more energetic kind of writing. 'We wanted an international flavour to the list, at a time when it was not fashionable. And we published Alice Walker, [whose The Color Purple has been a huge hit for the Press] who was the forerunner in the re-emergence of black women's writing…In the late 1990s, a good deal of feminist writing has been taken on by the mainstream publishers. Feminism itself is not so glamorous…It used to have huge sections in bookshops - not any more. The Women's Press has had to be clever. Kathy [Gale] and Mary [Hemming] have published increasingly diversely, and at the same time, have continued to cater to the core readership.'"

From 1985 to 1998, the financial stability achieved by Gale and Hemming was consistent in almost all years, except when Book Club accounting was for a time separated out from TWP. During this period "enormous [positive] attention" was paid by the media to TWP authors and books.

Kathy Gale: "The smart promotional materials for The Women's Press 20th anniversary celebration showcased another step forward in the modernisation and sophistication of our marketing and publicity approach. Author tours for Alice Walker, bell hooks, Andrea Dworkin and Mary Daly were sell-out successes. And we were to arrange a considerable number of substantial serialisation sales to national newspapers and magazines for books including Pretty Girls in Little Boxes by Joan Ryan and My Breast by Joyce Wadler."

In 1999, following the carefully considered resignations of Gale and Hemming Elsbeth Lindner was appointed MD. TWP continued to publish until 2002/3 when it largely became an imprint within Quartet Books, after nearly 25 years of historically significant publishing. Authors from that final period include Hester Kaplan (USA), Elizabeth Stead (Australia), Shamim Sarif (South Africa), and Anchee Min (China/USA). Long-time writers continuing with TWP in this period included Alice Walker, Caeia March, Joan Barfoot, and Stevie Davies.
