= Stephanie Dowrick =

Australian writer

Reverend Dr Stephanie Dowrick
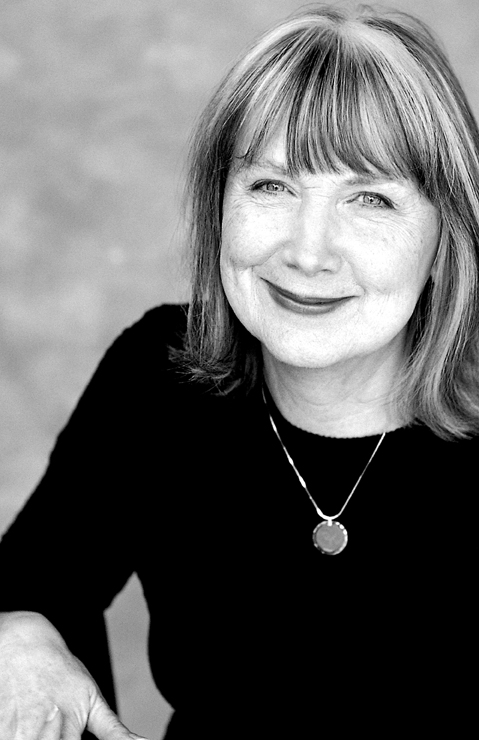
- Dowrick in December 2013
- Born: Stephanie Dowrick; 2 June 1947 (age 79); Wellington, New Zealand
- Education: PhD
- Alma mater: Victoria University of Wellington; University of Western Sydney
- Occupation: Writer
- Partner: Dr Paul Anthony Bauert
- Children: Two
- Website: stephaniedowrick.com

Stephanie Dowrick (born 2 June 1947) is an Australian writer, Interfaith Minister and social activist. She is the author of more than 20 books of fiction and non-fiction, five of them best-sellers. She was a publisher in Australia and the UK, where she co-founded The Women's Press, London.

== Background ==
Stephanie Dowrick was born in Wellington, New Zealand, on 2 June 1947. Her most significant early influence was the death of her mother Estelle Mary Dowrick (née Brisco, daughter of 7th baronet Sir Hylton Musgrave Campbell Brisco), in 1955.

As a child, Dowrick lived on the remote East Coast of New Zealand where each of her teacher parents had a one-teacher school, then in Western Samoa where her parents both taught at the newly opened Samoa College, before returning to New Zealand, during which time her mother died. She went to Sacred Heart College in Lower Hutt for her secondary education, finishing university entrance exams at the age of 16. She left New Zealand in 1967, aged 20, after a three-year stint studying law at Victoria University in Wellington while working as a law clerk and then a year in the university library. Both her parents were graduates of Victoria University.

She lived for some months in Israel, then in Europe from 1967–1983, mainly in London where her successful publishing and writing career began, also from 1970–71 in West Berlin. Her early adult years were “raw and difficult”.,

Dowrick became a Roman Catholic at the age of nine after the death of her mother and her father's remarriage. As an adult she was, for many years, a member of the Religious Society of Friends (Quakers). From the age of 14, she was active in peace and social justice politics., “The things that influenced me most were socialism, certainly the women’s movement – the big questions about why the dreadful things in the world are happening?”

Since 1983, she has mainly lived in Sydney with her family. She names her two children, Gabriel (b. 1983), Kezia (b.1984) as “the greatest love[s] of her life”; motherhood as her biggest achievement; and her greatest regret, “not to know her own mother as an adult woman”. In 2017 she married Darwin-based paediatrician Dr Paul Bauert, AOM.

Dowrick had a successful career in publishing in the UK, before founding The Women’s Press in 1977 within the Namara Group. From 1983, writing was her principal occupation although she also trained in and practised psychotherapy, and continued as a Director, then Chair, of The Women’s Press until 2000. She was Fiction Publisher at Allen and Unwin from 1989-2002. She has published 20 books, some of them international bestsellers, and award winning. Her best-known psychological book is Intimacy and Solitude. She is also a Rilke scholar and has published two books on the visionary poet, Rainer Maria Rilke, the second of these (2024) co-written with translator Mark S. Burrows. She continues to write on psychological subjects and to pursue mental health research.,,,

She was an Adjunct Fellow with the Writing and Society Research Group at Western Sydney University, where she graduated with a PhD degree in 2008. She was ordained in 2005 at the Cathedral of St John the Divine as an Interfaith Minister by the New Seminary, New York, founded in 1981 by pioneering interfaith activist, Rabbi Joseph Gelberman (1912-2010). Dowrick’s Sydney interfaith ministry was based at Pitt Street Uniting Church.

She remains active in interfaith circles, writing books and articles and giving talks and workshops, working to subdue religious prejudice and to increase inter-religious understanding as essential to effective national and global peacemaking, via major books such as Forgiveness & Other Acts of Love, Seeking the Sacred: Transforming Our View of Ourselves and One Another, The Universal Heart, and Heaven on Earth: Timeless Prayers of Wisdom and Love. Also, public speaking forums like “Happiness and Its Causes” and working with the Medical Association for the Prevention of War (MAPW). She authors many articles on humane regard for all, and peace.,

== Career ==
=== Publishing and The Women's Press ===
Dowrick worked first as a law clerk while studying law at Victoria University (Wellington, New Zealand). She lived independently from the age of 16. In 1967, before leaving New Zealand, she worked in the library at Victoria University. "She left New Zealand and an unhappy girlhood behind [following her mother’s death in 1955] at 20 and took on the world. 'I had a lot of vitality and huge energy.' With little formal training, but a mind ready for anything, she found herself in publishing."

On arrival in London at the age of 20 Dowrick became a ghost writer for the Evelyn Home personal advice column in the magazine Woman.

"Dowrick arrived in Europe at the age of 20 and, after a series of odd jobs in London and [West] Berlin returned to London...entered book publishing, and [after her start at George Harrap], in quick succession, became managing editor of New English Library and then editorial manager of Triad Paperbacks [Cape, Chatto and the Bodley Head, together with Granada Publishing]. It was a meteoric rise, during which time she somehow found the time to write her first book, Land of Zeus [published by NEL, London, 1975, and Doubleday, New York, 1976]. Then, in 1977, Dowrick met Naim Attallah, the charismatic London-based Palestinian philanthropist, owner of Quartet Books and the prestigious Literary Review. He was so impressed with Dowrick he helped finance a new feminist publishing house with her at the helm. 'We hit it off. Immediately,' he told HQ. 'She was very committed, full of energy, and she had passion. We formed The Women's Press with £100. I consider her to be one of the most exciting women ever, really. I knew her during the period when she had a fire in her belly and great fervour, and she was hungry, not for food, but to do something worthwhile and to fight for it.'"

The Women's Press was "a political press" explicitly linked with the Women's Liberation Movement. Along with Virago publishers, founded by Australian Carmen Callil, The Women's Press was one of the two the largest feminist publishers in the English language during the key period of the second wave of the women's liberation movement, largely considered to have run from 1969 to the mid-1980s, but with an influence that went way beyond that time. "Harriet Spicer, Virago's current Managing Director, believes that, under Dowrick, The Women’s Press distinguished itself in the feminist publishing industry…They contributed to the fact that in the UK, we have the strongest and most positive representation, across the board of feminist publishing activity in the world."

By February 1978, Dowrick was working full-time for The Women's Press. It issued its first five books, including Lolly Willowes by Sylvia Townsend Warner and a reprint of Jane Austen's Love and Freindship (sic). The 1978 list also included Elizabeth Barrett Browning's Aurora Leigh and Other Poems with a "dazzling" introduction by Cora Kaplan and the first British publication of Kate Chopin's The Awakening. The Women's Press emphasised contemporary works over classics and understood itself as raising consciousness and making effective contributions to women of all cultures and classes over a range of areas. Later authors contracted by Dowrick for The Women's Press included Lisa Alther, Alice Walker, whose Pulitzer Prize-winning The Color Purple "transformed African-American literature", Janet Frame, Andrea Dworkin, Lucy Goodison, Joanna Ryan, May Sarton, Susan Griffin, Sheila Ernst, Gillian Perry, Michèle Roberts, Joan Barfoot, Léonie Caldecott, Toni Cade Bambara, Angela Davis, Frankie Armstrong, Phyllis Chesler, Rozsika Parker, the Spare Rib collective, Janice Raymond, Paula Weideger, Mary Daly, Marge Piercy, June Arnold, Flannery O’Connor, Virginia Woolf, Michèle Barrett, Helen Taylor, Charlotte Perkins Gilman, and Patricia Grace.

Dowrick was an active Director of TWP until 1985, then was Chair of The Women's Press Ltd Board of Directors from 1991-2002, working closely with MD Kathy Gale (1991-1999) and with Mary Hemming, including on sales in Australia and New Zealand where distribution was taken over by Allen & Unwin.

Dowrick was Chair of The Women's Press Board of Directors from 1989 to 1997. She was later Chairperson of The Women's Press, before its amalgamation with Quartet Books.

Dowrick was the first winner of Women in Publishing's Pandora Award in 1981.

Dowrick worked for Allen & Unwin, Sydney, from 1989 to 1992, as their founding part-time Fiction Publisher.

=== Psychology/Psychotherapy/Wellbeing ===
Dr Stephanie Dowrick has contributed through writing and public speaking to the fields of psychology, psychotherapy, wellbeing, mental health research since the 1990s.

She describes herself as "researcher/writer before clinician", while remaining "unconditionally grateful to the many hundreds of people who have put their trust in me in workshops, retreats, or during my years in private practice".

Her initial training was in analytic psychotherapy plus psychosynthesis. She names as early inspiration her mother, whose reading life included Jung and Freud, then clinicians from "Red Therapy" in London, most especially Dr Lucy Goodison, Sheila Ernst, Dr Joanna Ryan, early authors of Dowrick at The Women's Press in London. In Sydney, she shared rooms with Jungian therapist and environment activist, Dr Sally Gillespie. She acknowledges her own need for extensive, varied psychotherapy.

For 10 years, she was "Inner Life" columnist for Good Weekend Magazine (SMH and the Age), "On the Couch" fortnightly guest of Geraldine Doogue, AO on ABC Radio National's "Life Matters" and a frequent guest with Tony Delroy on ABC Radio "Night Life".

Alongside Lyn Swinburne, AO she gave wellbeing presentations across Australia for Breast Cancer Network Australia (BCNA) presented multiple times at Happiness & Its Causes seminars (until 2024), and at psycho-spiritual workshops in Australia, Japan, Bhutan, the UK, Aotearoa/New Zealand.

Her "Inner Life" columns were adapted and published in Free Thinking (Allen & Unwin, Sydney, 2004: ISBN 1741145201) and Everyday Kindness (Allen &a Unwin, Sydney, 2011: ISBN 9781742378244).

Her mental health outreach through writing and public speaking is noted by psychiatrists. Professor Pat McGorry, AO: “The blend of psychotherapeutic depth, spirituality and practical common sense is rare. Dr Dowrick has made an array of connected insights accessible to us all: a timely gift in our anxious and troubled world." Professor Marie Bismark: "From Forgiveness & Other Acts of Love to Your name is not Anxious, Stephanie’s words and insights have enriched my life with wisdom, hope and courage."

Dowrick's first major non-fiction book, Intimacy and Solitude: Balancing Closeness and Independence, published in 1991, has been revised and updated twice in the English language, most recently in 2021. It has been widely translated and remains in print. A companion volume, The Intimacy and Solitude Self-Therapy Book, was published in the USA by W.W. Norton as The Intimacy and Solitude Workbook. (Both books were published in German in 1995, 1996. ISBN 388104261X and ISBN 3881042733.)

"Intimacy and Solitude combines rigorous analysis with an expensive moral dimension - a rare juxtaposition at the time it was written, long before the current vogue for reassessing the place of ethics in our lives. It is a comprehensive, text-based survey of psychological theory, accompanied by an exhaustive bibliography, but mediated through Dowrick’s candidly personal experience. ..[i]t became a bible for people attempting to grapple seriously with those nebulous issues commandeered, in these secular days, by fluffy New Age thinkers and fanatics on the religious right."

"The capacity to internalise positive experiences [which can be learned], whether they be with our parents as small children or with other loved ones in later life, has a direct bearing on our capacity to be comfortable with our own company; in other words, to enjoy our own solitude. It is a stunningly simple insight which Dowrick believes also determines our capacity to be intimate with other people."

Later major books continue to reflect social, structural as well as deeply personal and spiritual concerns. They include The Universal Heart, Forgiveness & Other Acts of Love, Choosing Happiness: Life and Soul Essentials, Seeking the Sacred: Transforming Our View of Ourselves and One Another, and Creative Journal Writing: A guided journey of self-expression, personal growth, and supportive reflection. Translated editions include Korean, Arabic, Greek, Swedish, French, Russian. Her most recent psychological book, Your name is not Anxious (2023), published in the US by St Martin’s Press, won a Gold Medal in the "Living Now Book Awards 2025".

=== Writing ===
From 1983, writing became Dowrick's primary work. Her books includes fiction and non-fiction for children and adults.

Dowrick's first novel, Running Backwards Over Sand (1985), was autobiographical in part with the book's protagonist Zoe Delightey's mother dying at an early age.

In a review of Choosing Happiness (2006), The Age newspaper wrote: "Dowrick's gift is to bring the sacred into the mundane." Everyday Kindness (2011) was described in The Sydney Morning Herald as "the practical expression of her spiritual ethic."

Dowrick's more explicitly spiritual books include Seeking the Sacred (2010), and In the Company of Rilke, a scholarly spiritual study of the work of the European poet, Rainer Maria Rilke.

=== Spirituality ===
Dowrick has been described as a "pioneering individual" in interfaith, post-denominational spirituality. Her spiritual journey has included Buddhism, Judaism and Christianity, and her influences include Ven Thich Nhat Hanh, Dom Bede Griffiths, Thomas Merton, and Irish poet John O'Donohue.

In June 2005, Dowrick became one of Australia's first Interfaith Ministers. She trained at the New Seminary, New York, an interfaith seminary founded in 1979 by Rabbi Joseph Gelberman.

Since 2006, Dowrick has led an interfaith spiritually inclusive congregation in Sydney, Australia. Since 2000, she has led retreats in New Zealand.

=== Media ===
Dowrick has contributed to Australia's literary and media culture over many years.

She is a literary journalist and columnist for Fairfax Media on issues of ethics and social justice, feminism, spirituality, and refugees in Australia.

She has appeared as a regular guest on ABC Radio on a range of programmes including Life Matters, The Spirit of Things, All in the Mind, and Tony Delroy's NightLife. From 1995 to 2004, she was "On the Couch" presenter on ABC Radio National's Life Matters. From 2001 to 2010, she was the "Inner Life" columnist for Good Weekend Magazine (The Sydney Morning Herald and The Age).

She was an ambassador and well-being presenter for Breast Cancer Network Australia (BCNA).

She is an ambassador for the International Women's Development Agency (IWDA).

== Awards ==
- Pandora Award, Women in Publishing, 1981
- Nautilus Silver Award, Choosing Happiness (Psychology/Personal Growth), 2009
- COVR (Coalition of Visionary Resources) Award (Best in print – General Interest/How to winner), Creative Journal Writing, 2010
- Nautilus Grand/Gold Award, Heaven on Earth (Religion/Spirituality category)
- Nautilus Silver Award, You Are the Future: Living the Questions with Rainer Maria Rilke, (Body/Mind/Spirit Practices category), 2025
- Living Now Awards Gold Medal, Your Name is Not Anxious, (Relaxation/Mindfulness category), 2025

== Works ==
=== Nonfiction ===
- Land of Zeus, Doubleday, New York; New English Library, London (1974)
- Why Children? co-edited with Grundberg, Sibyl. Harcourt Brace, Jovanovich, New York; The Women's Press, London (1980)
- After the Gulf War, For Peace in the Middle East, co-edited with Kettle, St John. Pluto Press, Sydney (1991)
- Speaking with the Sun: New Stories by Australian and New Zealand Writers, co-edited with Parkin, Jane. Allen & Unwin, Sydney (1991).
- Intimacy and Solitude: Balancing Closeness and Independence, William Heinemann Australia, Melbourne; The Women's Press, London (1992); W.W. Norton & Co, New York (1994); revised edition, Random House, Sydney; The Women's Press, London (2002).
- The Intimacy and Solitude: Self-Therapy Book, William Heinemann Australia, Melbourne; The Women's Press, London (1993); published as The Intimacy and Solitude Workbook, W.W. Norton & Co, New York (1994).
- Forgiveness and Other Acts of Love, Viking Penguin, Melbourne; W.W. Norton & Co, New York; The Women's Press, London (1997)
- Daily Acts of Love, Penguin Books, Melbourne (1999)
- The Universal Heart: A Practical Guide to Love, Viking, Melbourne (2000); Michael Joseph, London (2002).
- Every Day A New Beginning, Penguin, Melbourne (2002)
- Living Words: Journal Writing for Self-Discovery, Insight & Creativity, Viking, Melbourne (2003).
- Free Thinking: On Happiness, Emotional Intelligence, Relationships, Power and Spirit, Allen & Unwin, Sydney (2004)
- Choosing Happiness: Life & Soul Essentials, Allen & Unwin, Sydney (2005); Tarcher/Penguin, New York (2007).
- Creative Journal Writing: The Art and Heart of Reflection, Allen & Unwin, Sydney (2007); Tarcher/Penguin, New York (2009).
- The Almost Perfect Marriage: One-Minute Relationship Skills, Allen & Unwin, Sydney (2007)
- In the Company of Rilke (incl. original translations by Burrows, Mark S.) Allen & Unwin, Sydney (2007); Tarcher/Penguin, New York (2009).
- Seeking the Sacred: Transforming Our View of Ourselves and One Another, Tarcher/Penguin, New York; Allen & Unwin, Sydney (2010).
- Everyday Kindness: Shortcuts to a Happier and More Confident Life, Allen & Unwin, Sydney (2011); Tarcher/Penguin, New York (2012).
- Heaven on Earth: Timeless Prayers of Wisdom and Love, Tarcher/Penguin, New York; Allen & Unwin, Sydney (2013).
- Your Name is Not Anxious: A Very Personal Guide to Putting Anxiety in its Place, Allen & Unwin, Sydney (2023) ISBN 9781761470066
- You Are the Future: Living the Questions with Rainer Maria Rilke with Mark S. Burrows, Monkfish, New York (2024) ISBN 9781958972533
- Creative Journal Writing: A Guided Journey of Self-Expression, Personal Growth, and Supportive Reflection, Allen & Unwin, Sydney (2025) ISBN 9781761472022

=== Fiction ===
- Running Backwards Over Sand Viking Penguin, Melbourne, London (1985).
- Tasting Salt Viking Penguin, Melbourne, London (1997).

=== Children's ===
- Katherine Rose says no! Random House, Sydney (1995).
- The Moon Shines Out of the Dark Allen & Unwin, Sydney (2012).
