= Christine E. Morris =

Irish classical archaeologist

- Occupations: Archaeologist, classical scholar

Academic background
- Education: University of Cambridge; University College London

Christine E. Morris is an Irish classical scholar, who is the Andrew A. David Professor in Greek Archaeology and History at Trinity College Dublin. An expert on religion in the Aegean Bronze Age, her work uses archaeological evidence to examine the practice and experience of belief. She is a member of the Standing Committee for Archaeology for the Royal Irish Academy.

== Career ==
Educated at Churchill College at the University of Cambridge, and at University College London, Morris worked for the British School at Athens prior to her first appointment at Trinity College Dublin in 1994. She is the Andrew A. David Professor in Greek Archaeology and History and an expert on the Aegean Bronze Age, with a particular focus on material cultures, including ceramics and figural sculpture, as well as inter-cultural relationships and religious practice. In collaboration with Alan Peatfield, Morris has argued that Minoan religion should be viewed as experiential and shamanistic, and that perhaps the Minoan figurines represent altered states of consciousness. Morris has also argued for greater emphasis to be played on the role of the individual in figural craft practice.

The most widely cited of Morris' works is Ancient Goddesses: the Myths and Evidence, co-edited with Lucy Goodison. In it they establish a theoretical framework for the consideration of the ancient goddess, as well as questioning how goddess figurines were used. It was described by Christine Gudorf as a "critical survey of existing archaeological evidence of prehistoric goddesses in Europe and the ancient Near East".

She is a member of the Standing Committee for Archaeology for the Royal Irish Academy.

In 2014 she was elected a fellow of Trinity College Dublin.

== Selected publications ==
- Recht, Laerke; Morris, Christine E. (2021). "Chariot kraters and horse-human relations in Late Bronze Age Greece and Cyprus". The Annual of the British School at Athens. 116: 95–132. doi:10.1017/S0068245421000022. ISSN 0068-2454.
- Bodies in ecstasy: shamanic elements in Minoan religion in, editor(s) Diana Stein, Sarah Kielt Costello, Karen Polinger Foster, The Routledge Companion to Ecstatic Experience in the Ancient World, London, Routledge, 2021, pp. 264 – 283
- Images from a usable past: the Classical themes of Irish Coinage, 1928–2002 in, editor(s) Donncha O'Rourke & Isabelle Torrance, Classics and Irish Politics 1916–2016, Oxford, Oxford University Press, 2020, pp. 393–406
- Morris, Christine (1993). "Hands Up for the Individual! The Role of Attribution Studies in Aegean Prehistory". Cambridge Archaeological Journal. 3 (1): 41–66. doi:10.1017/S0959774300000718. ISSN 0959-7743.
