= Eleanor L. Hall =

American psychotherapist

Nor Hall (born Eleanor L. Hall; 1947) is a post-Jungian psychotherapist and author. Her work focuses on archetypal studies, particularly gender issues and cultural mythology.

== Biography ==
She has practiced archetypal psychology since 1972 while maintaining a career as a mythopoetic writer, independent lecturer, workshop leader, consultant, and theatre artist. Her work in recent years as a research dramaturg for Archipelago and content developer for new plays evolved out of participation in Pantheatre's Myth & Theatre Festivals in France. Hall is a volunteer case consultant for the Center for Victims of Torture in Minneapolis, a Pacifica Graduate Institute adjunct faculty and thesis advisor, an advisor for the Ashlar Institute on trauma issues, an advisor for Spring: A Journal of Archetype and Culture, an advisor for Pantheatre, a member of the Walker Art Center Producers’ Council and friend of Rain Taxi Review of books. In 2011 she was a featured guest at These Women!, a conference in Santa Barbara at the Institute for Cultural Change that was named after her book titled Those Women (1988, republished as Dreaming in Red in 2005). In 2015, Hall was a Coffee House Press Artist in the Stacks at OPUS Archives at Pacifica Graduate Institute. She is currently working as a Community Curator for the Counter-Culture video archive with Peter Shea for the Preserve Historic Dinkytown Folk History Initiative in Minneapolis.

== Education ==
- 1969. BA cum laude, Beloit College in Anthropology and Religious Studies.
- 1976. PhD in the History of Consciousness at the University of California, Santa Cruz with an emphasis in history of psychoanalysis, classical mythology, and poetry. Teaching assistant to Norman O. Brown.
- 1978. Post doctoral study at the C. G. Jung Institute, Kusnacht, Switzerland.

== Bibliography ==
=== Books ===
- The Book of Ours. Santa Cruz, CA: University of California, 1971. Co-written with Norman O. Brown. Originally came with five audiotapes. Privately printed.
- Mothers and Daughters: Reflections on the Archetypal Feminine. Minneapolis, MN: Rusoff Books, 1976. With drawings by Ellen Kennedy. Includes bibliographical footnotes. From verso: “Mothers and Daughters originated as a lecture given at the College of Saint Catherine at the invitation of the Arts Core Program, March 8, 1976.”
- The Moon and the Virgin: Reflections on the Archetypal Feminine. New York: Harper and Row, 1980. With drawings by Ellen Kennedy. Includes index and bibliography. Paperback ISBN 0-06-090793-2. Hardcover ISBN 0-06-011703-6. Also printed in the UK in 1980 and 1991 by The Women's Press.
- Those Women. Dallas, TX: Spring Publications, 1988. Republished in 2004 and 2019 ISBN 978-0882140711.
- Broodmales: A Psychological Essay on Men in Childbirth. Dallas, TX: Spring Publications, 1989. Includes reprint of Warren R. Dawson's The Custom of Couvade, originally published by Manchester University Press in 1929. ISBN 0-88214-340-9.
- Irons in the Fire. Barrytown, NY: Station Hill Press, 1998. Consists of the prose piece "Irons in the Fire" and the poem "End of the Iron Age." Republished in 2002 and 2017. ISBN 978-1581771602.
- Dreaming in Red: The Women's Dionysian Initiation Chamber in Pompeii. Putnam, CT: Spring Publications, 2005. Consists of the essay "Women's Dionysian Initiation: The Villa of Mysteries in Pompeii" by Linda Fierz-David and the prose piece "Those Women" by Nor Hall. These works were released originally as a two-volume box set. Includes bibliographical references. ISBN 0-88214-551-7.
- Traces. Minneapolis, MN: Ohm Editions, 2010. This chapbook was published as part of the installation/performance Traces, in collaboration with Harriet Bart and Laura Crosby.
- Postcards from Mona. Minneapolis, MN: Ohm Editions, 2019. This chapbook was published as a companion volume to Traces.

=== Anthologized essays ===
- “Behind the Scenes in Psychotherapy.” In James Hillman and Thomas Moore (Eds.), A Festival of Archetypal Psychology: Audiotapes Recorded Live at the University of Notre Dame. Louisville, CO: Sounds True, Inc., 1991. ISBN 978-1-56455-209-9.
- “Aphrodite in Avignon.” Prose piece in Kathleen Coskran and C. W. Truesdale (Eds.), An Inn Near Kyoto: Writing by American Women Abroad (418-424). Minneapolis: New Rivers Press, 1998. ISBN 0-89823-181-7.
- “White Riding: Milking a Legend. Essay in Stan Marlan (Ed.), Archetypal Psychologies: Reflections in Honor of James Hillman (261-280). New Orleans, LA: Spring Journal Books, 2008. ISBN 978-1-882670-54-3.
- "Skinny Language." Essay in Shawn Lawrence Otto (Ed.), "Writers United for All Families: Seventeen Readings on Love and Liberty." St. Croix, MN: Chisel Finger Press, 2012. ASIN B009MBNPXM.

=== Selected journal articles ===
- “The Goddess in the Consulting Room: A Jungian Perspective.” Lady-Unique-Inclination-of-the-Night 4, 5-18. [S.l.]: Sowing Circle Press, 1979.
- “The Maenads: Mad Maidens, Meditative Matrons.” Sphinx: A Journal for Archetypal Psychology and the Arts 2, 95-107. London: London Convivium for Archetypal Studies, 1989.
- “Changing the Subject: Behind the Scenes in Psychotherapy's Theatre.” Sphinx: A Journal for Archetypal Psychology and the Arts 4, 81-104. London: Convivium for Archetypal Studies, 1992.
- “Scènes de la Thérapie.” Initiations 12, 13-19. City of Brussels: Initiations, 1994.
- “A Collage That Spoke.” Spring: A Journal of Archetype and Culture 59: Opening the Dreamway: In the Psyche of Robert Duncan, 79-94. Putman, CT: Spring Journal, Inc., 1996.
- “Architecture of Intimacy.” Spring: A Journal of Archetype and Culture 60: Marriages, 13-26. Putnam, CT: Spring Journal, Inc., 1996.
- Vanishing Writing: Collaborative Text Development for Non Text-Based Theatre. The Open Page 6, March 2001, 115-119. Holstebro, Denmark: Odin Teatrets Forlag, 2001.
- “How I Came to Understand a Line from Dylan Thomas.” Tijdschrift met veranderlijke naam [Magazine with a Changeable Name] 4, issue title Night Trope. [S.l.]: [s.n], 2002.
- “Channel a Muse: Notes Toward the Construction of a Mother-Daughter Biography.” Spring: A Journal of Archetype and Culture 70: Muses, 105-116. New Orleans, LA: Spring Journal, Inc., 2004.

=== Art exhibition catalogs ===
- Woman Lost and Woman Found: Images of an Ancient Passage. St. Paul, MN: St. Catherine University. Hall wrote the introduction to this work, which accompanied Patricia Olson's art exhibit The Mysteries, which ran 18 September – 27 October 1999 at St. Catherine University, St. Paul.
- Saltworks: The Preservation of Women's Spirit. Hall wrote the introduction to this work to accompany Sandra Menefee Taylor's art exhibit with the same name, which ran from March 12 – April 17, 2005 at St. Catherine University, St. Paul.
- Harriet Bart: Abracadabra and Other Forms of Protection. Minneapolis, MN: University of Minnesota Press. Edited by Laura Wertheim Joseph. ISBN 978-1517908614.

== Selected performances, lectures, and workshops ==
- 2000. Lecture: “On Gossips.” 8th Myth & Theatre Festival titled “Gossip … Humanity's Small-Talk.” Location: Garter Lane Arts Center, Waterford, Ireland.
- 2001. Performance: “A New Fine Shame: The Life and Loves of Lou Andreas-Salome.” Collaboration with Ellen Hemphill. Location: Manbites Dog Theatre, Durham, NC.
- 2002. Lecture: “White Riding: Reflections on the Topic of Women and the History of Sacrifice Focusing on Multiple Meanings in Godiva's Act/Performance.” Undercover: Women and Sacrifice, collaboration with Carran Waterfield of Triangle Theatre. Location: Herbert Art Gallery and Museum, Jordan Well, Coventry, UK.
- 2005. Performance: “Aphrodite's Back: A Valentine Reveal.” Collaboration with visual artist Harriet Bart and musician Franz Kamin. A semi-historical illustrated discursus on eros, featuring Nor Hall (as Professor Victoriana) on the archetypal background of Valentine's Day, "Coilular Angel" by composer Kamin, and book launch of Bart's PUNICA GRANATUM. Co-sponsored by Rain Taxi Review of Books. Location: Southern Theatre, Minneapolis, MN.
- 2005. Residency and performance: “Daylight (for Minneapolis).” With Sarah Michelson. Three week residency followed by performance. Location: Walker Art Center McGuire Theatre, Minneapolis, MN.
- 2006. Performance: “SHE Captains.” Research dramaturg and co-writer with Shawn McConneloug's Orchestra. Movement, dance, and narrative. Location: Thorpe building, N.E.Minneapolis, MN.
- 2006. Keynote speech: “Hot Botts and Soul Blasts: Naming the Furnace Body.” 5th International conference on Cast Iron Art, Ironbridging Art & Technology. Location: Ironbridge Gorge World Heritage site, Shropshire, UK.
- 2007. Performance: “Mirror, Mirror.” Opening of Laura Crosby photo exhibit “Who is the Fairest One of All?” on the objectification of the surgically altered female body. Location: Metropolitan State University, St. Paul, MN.
- 2011. Symposium: “These Women! A Weekend of Dialogue, Exploration, and Dynamic Conversation.” Interviewed by Ginette Paris. Location: Institute for Cultural Change, Santa Barbara, CA.
- 2011. Performance: “It’s Women's Work, I.” Part of “Traces,” a collaboration with Harriet Bart and Laura Crosby. Explores the unexpected journey of a woman and children caught in the web of war through narrative poetry, performance, art objects, and photography. Location: Open Eye Figure Theatre, Minneapolis, MN.
- 2014. Lecture: “What the foot wants: city as set for movement theater.” The Dallas Institute of Humanities & Culture’s James Hillman 2014 Symposium “Conversing with James Hillman: City & Soul” (October 16-18, 2014).
- 2015. Lecture: “Conversing in memoriam.” The Dallas Institute of Humanities & Culture’s James Hillman 2015 Symposium “Conversing with James Hillman: Senex & Puer” (October 16-17, 2015).
- 2015. Lecture: “Nor Hall’s Opus: Archives, Comic Books, and the Archetypal Memoir.” Location: Pacifica Graduate Institute, Santa Barbara. Part of the Coffee House Press In the Stacks series; Hall was Opus Archives’ artist-in-residence February 28 – March 14, 2015.
