= Griselda Pollock =

British art historian (b. 1949)

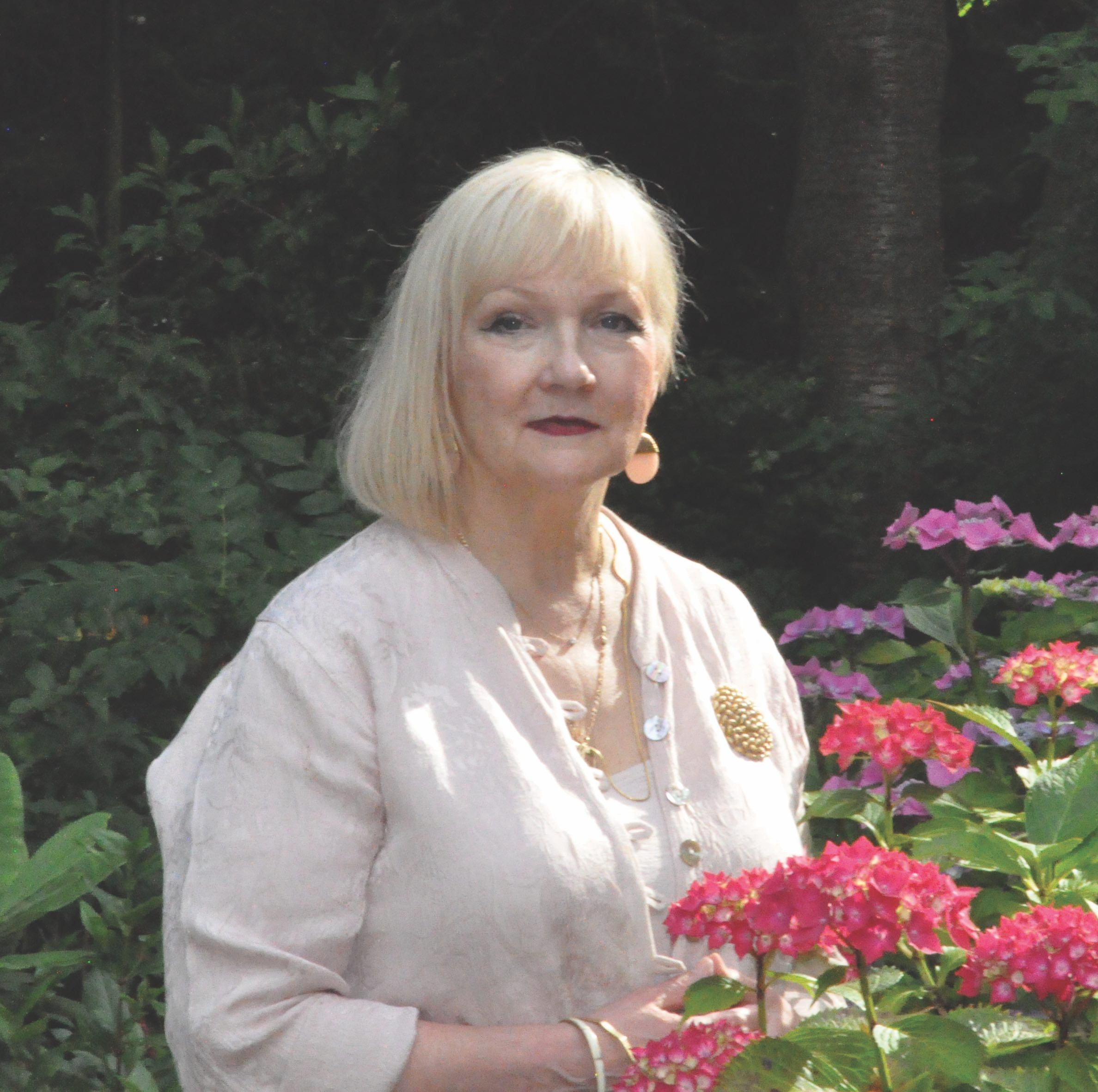
- Griselda Pollock in 2019
- Born: March 11, 1949 (age 77); Bloemfontein, Union of South Africa

Academic background
- Education: University of Oxford; Courtauld Institute of Art

Academic work
- Discipline: Art history

Griselda Frances Sinclair Pollock (born 11 March 1949) is a British art historian, whose work focuses on analyzing visual arts and visual culture through global feminist and postcolonial feminist lenses. Since 1977, Pollock has been an influential scholar of modern, avant-garde, postmodern, and contemporary art. She is a major influence in feminist theory, feminist art history, and gender studies. She is known for her feminist approach to art history, which aims to deconstruct the lack of appreciation and importance of women in art outside of being objects for the male gaze.

Pollock's research offers historical analyses of the social dynamics that shape the sexual political environment within art history. Pollock has written texts exclusively focused on women in order to intentionally shift from traditional art history, which has focused primarily on the work of male artists. Pollock's initiative enabled appreciation for female artists such as Mary Cassatt, Eva Hesse, and Charlotte Salomon. Her theoretical and methodological innovations, including her book Vision and Difference 1988, are still influential, and many of her remarks apply to contemporary concerns such as the political subtexts for women portrayed in advertising.

== Life and work ==
Pollock was born in Bloemfontein, South Africa to Alan Winton Seton Pollock and Kathleen Alexandra (née Sinclair), She grew up in Canada. Moving to Britain during her teens, Pollock studied Modern History at Oxford (1967–1970) and History of European Art at the Courtauld Institute of Art (1970–72). She received her doctorate in 1980 for a study of Vincent van Gogh and Dutch Art: A reading of his notions of the modern. After teaching at Reading and Manchester universities, Pollock joined the University of Leeds in 1977 as lecturer in History of Art and Film and was appointed to a Personal Chair in Social and Critical Histories of Art in 1990. In 2001, she became Director of the Centre for Cultural Analysis, Theory and History at the University of Leeds, where she is Professor of Social and Critical Histories of Art.

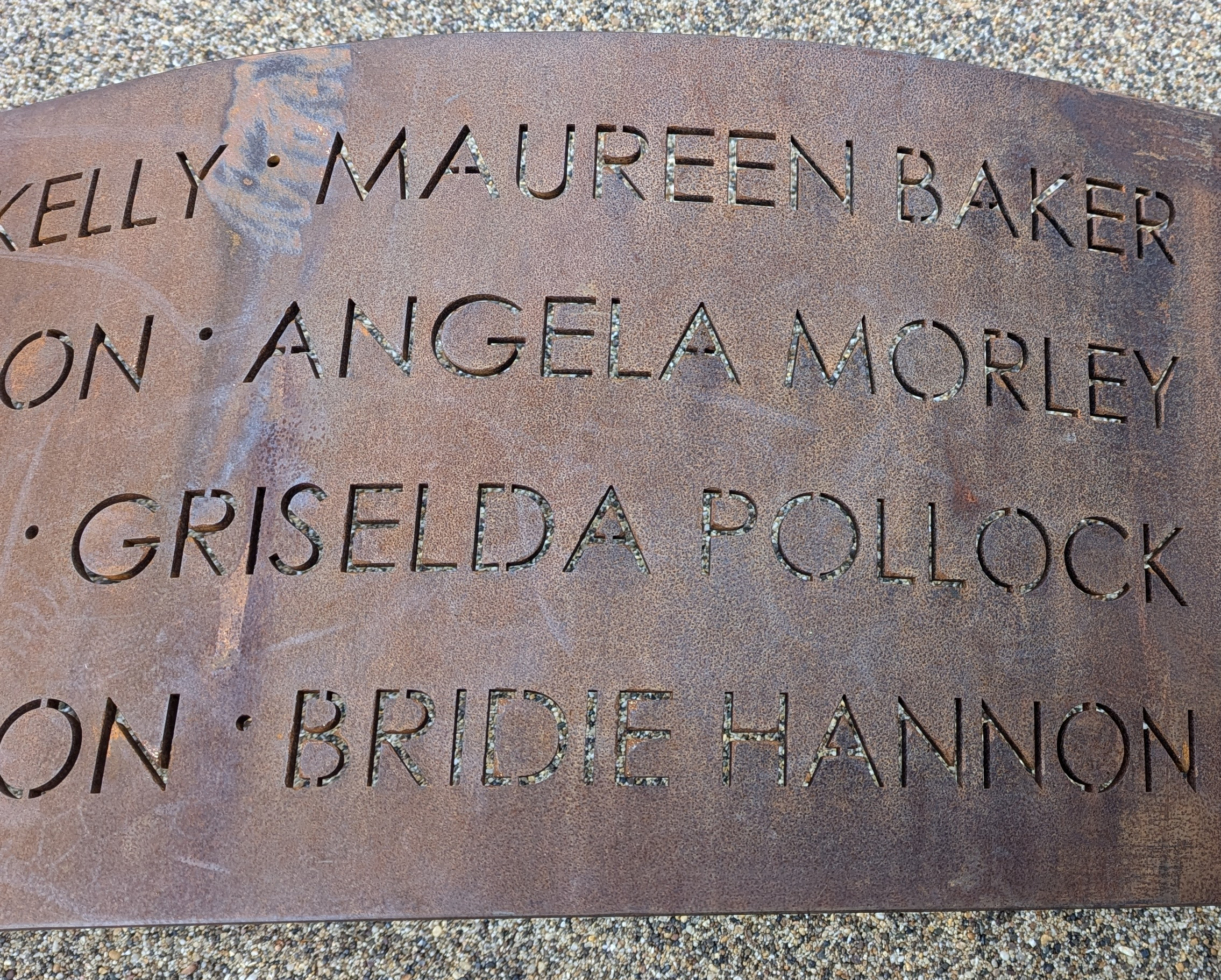
Segment of Ribbons sculpture featuring the names of Griselda Pollock and others (cropped)

Pollock was awarded an honorary doctorate by the Courtauld Institute in 2019, together with Daniella Luxembourg, and delivered the graduation speech. The Estonian Academy of Art also awarded her an Honorary Doctorate in 2019 and she gave a keynote lecture: "Why do we still love Vincent?" On March 5, 2020, Pollock was named as the 2020 Holberg Prize Laureate "for her groundbreaking contributions to feminist art history and cultural studies." Pollock was nominated to have her name feature on a public artwork in Leeds, alongside 382 other women from the city; that artwork, Ribbons, was unveiled in October 2024.

== Art history ==
Pollock's interest and involvement in the women's movement motivated her to create change in the world of art history and its perception of women. This change was attempted by many researchers before her but was only possible due to her innovative approaches observed in her book Vision and Difference, 1988. In this book, she identifies the world's political system to be the main issue with women's depiction. She explains the relationship between systems of representation and ideology which, in turn, create the visual language used by political advertising to depict women in society. Identifying these strategies of representation provided additional tools to feminist activists seeking to change the construction of women in art and society in general.

Her work challenges mainstream models of art and art history that have previously excluded the role of women in art. She examines the interaction of the social categories of gender, class, and race, and the relationship between these categories, psychoanalysis, and art, drawing on the work of such French cultural theorists as Michel Foucault. Her theorization of subjectivity takes both psychoanalysis and Foucault's ideas about social control into account.

A range of concepts have been developed by Pollock to theorize and practice critical feminist interventions in art's histories. Some of these include: old mistresses, vision and difference, avant-garde gambits, generations and geographies, differencing the canon and most recently, the virtual feminist museum.

== Cultural studies and cultural analysis ==
Pollock is the founding director of the Centre for Cultural Analysis, Theory, and History at the University of Leeds. Initiated with a grant from the then AHRB in 2001, CentreCATH is a transdisciplinary project connecting fine art, histories of art and cultural studies across the shared engagements with class, gender, sexuality, post-colonial critique, and queer theory. In 2007, with Max Silverman, Pollock initiated the research project "Concentrationary Memories: The Politics of Representation", which explores the concept of an anxious and vigilant form of cultural memory analyzing the devastating effects of the totalitarian assault on the human condition and alert to the persistent not only of this perpetual threat but is invasion of popular culture. The project explored the forms of aesthetic resistance to totalitarian terror. Four edited collections have been produced:

- Concentrationary Cinema: Aesthetics and Political Resistance in Night and Fog by Alain Resnais (London and New York: Berghan 2011)
  - Winner of the 2011 Fraszna-Krausz Prize for Best Book on the Moving Image
- Concentrationary Memory: Totalitarian Terror and Cultural Resistance (London: I B Tauris, 2013)
- Concentrationary Imaginaries: Tracing Totalitarian Violence in Popular Culture (London: I B Tauris, 2015)
- Concentrationary Art: Jean Cayrol, the Lazarean and the Everyday in Post-war Film, Literature, Music and the Visual Arts (Berghahn, 2019).

== Publications ==
- (with Fred Orton) Vincent van Gogh: Artist of his Time, Oxford: Phaidon Press, 1978; US-edition: E. P. Dutton ISBN 0-7148-1883-6. Edited and re-published in: Orton & Pollock 1996, pp. 3–51
- (with Fred Orton) "Les Données Bretonnantes: La Prairie de Représentation", in: Art History III/3, 1980, pp. 314–344. Reprinted in: Orton & Pollock 1996, pp. 53–88
- Vincent van Gogh in zijn Hollandse jaren: Kijk op stad en land door Van Gogh en zijn tijdgenoten 1870–1890, exh. cat. Amsterdam, Rijksmuseum Vincent van Gogh, 1980/1981 (no ISBN)
- The Journals of Marie Bashkirtseff, London: Virago (newly introduced with Rozsika Parker), 1985.
- Framing Feminism: Art & the Women' s Movement 1970–85 (Griselda Pollock with Rozsika Parker), 1987.
- Vision and Difference: [Femininity, Feminism, and Histories of Art], London: Routledge, and New York: Methuen, 1987.
- "Inscriptions in the Feminine". In Catherine de Zegher (ed.), Inside the Visible. MIT, 1996. 67–87.
- "Oeuvres Autistes." In: Versus 3, 1994, pp. 14–18
- (Edited with Richard Kendall)Dealing with Degas: Representations of Women and the Politics of Vision. London: Pandora Books, 1992 (now Rivers Oram Press).
- Avant-Garde Gambits: Gender and the Colour of Art History, London: Thames and Hudson, 1993.
- The Ambivalence of Pleasure, Getty Art History Oral Documentation Project, interview by Richard Cándida Smith, Getty Research Institute, 1997.
- Mary Cassatt Painter of Modern Women, London: Thames & Hudson: World of Art, 1998.
- Aesthetics. Politics. Ethics Julia Kristeva 1966–96, Special Issue Guest Edited parallax, no. 8, 1998.
- Differencing the Canon: Feminism and the Histories of Art, London: Routledge, 1999.
- A Very Long Engagement: Singularity and Difference in the Critical Writing on Eva Hesse in Griselda Pollock with Vanessa Corby (eds), Encountering Eva Hesse, London and Munich: Prestel, 2006.
- (Edited with Joyce Zemans), Museums after Modernism, Boston: Blackwells, 2007.
- Griselda Pollock, Medium & Memory:Eight Artists in Conversation (HackelBury Fine Art, London, 2023)

=== Books ===
- Millet. London: Oresko Books. 1977.
- Mary Cassatt, London: Jupiter Books, 1980
- Pollock, Griselda; Parker, Rozsika (1981). Old Mistresses; Women, Art and Ideology. London: Routledge & Kegan. Reissued by I.B. Tauris in 2013.
- (with Fred Orton) Avant-Gardes and Partisans Reviewed, Manchester University Press, 1996. ISBN 0-7190-4398-0
- Looking Back to the Future: Essays by Griselda Pollock from the 1990s, New York: G&B New Arts, introduced by Penny Florence, 2000. ISBN 90-5701-132-8.
- Encounters in the Virtual Feminist Museum: Time, Space and the Archive, London: Routledge, 2007. ISBN 978-0-415-41374-9
- After-effects/After-images: Trauma and aesthetic transformation in the Virtual Feminist Museum, Manchester: Manchester University Press, 2013. 978-0-7190-8798-1
- Charlotte Salomon and the Theatre of Memory. Yale University Press. 2018. ISBN 978-0-300-10072-3.
- Killing men and dying women : imagining difference in 1950s New York painting. Manchester, England: Manchester University Press. 2022. ISBN 9781526164193.
- Woman in Art: Helen Rosenau's "little Book" of 1944. London: Yale University Press. 2023.

==== As editor ====
- (Edited), Generations and Geographies: Critical Theories and Critical Practices in Feminism and the Visual Arts, Routledge, 1996. ISBN 0-415-14128-1
- (Edited with Valerie Mainz), Work and the Image, 2 vols. London: Ashgate Press, 2000.
- (Edited), Psychoanalysis and the Image, Boston and Oxford: Blackwell, 2006. ISBN 1-4051-3461-5
- Pollock, Griselda; Turvey-Sauron, Victoria, eds. (2008). The Sacred and the Feminine. London: I.B. Tauris.
- Digital and Other Virtualities: Renegotiating the Image, edited by Griselda Pollock and Antony Bryant, I.B. Tauris, 2010. 9781845115685.
- Ettinger, Bracha L. (2020). Pollock, Griselda (ed.). Matrixial Subjectivity, Aesthetics and Ethics. Palgrave MacMillan. ISBN 978-1-137-34515-8.

==== Chapters ====
- (Edited with Richard Thomson), On not seeing Provence: Van Gogh and the landscape of consolation, 1888–1889, in: Framing France: The representation of landscape in France, 1870–1914, Manchester University Press, 1998, pp. 81–118 ISBN 0-7190-4935-0
- "Chapter 1: Feminist interventions in the histories of art: an introduction; Chapter 3: Modernity and the spaces of femininity". Vision and Difference: Feminism, Femininity and the Histories of Art (PDF). Routledge Classics. 2003.

=== Articles ===
- "Artists mythologies and media genius, madness and art history". Screen. 21 (3): 57–96. 1980.
- Pollock, Griselda; Orton, Fred (1982). "Cloisonism?". Art History. 3: 341–348.
- "Agency and the Avant-Garde: Studies in Authorship and History by Way of Van Gogh". Block (15): 5–15. 1989. Reprinted in: Orton & Pollock 1996, pp. 315–342
- "Trouble in the archives". Differences: A Journal of Feminist Cultural Studies. 4 (3). Duke University Press. 1992. OCLC 936734168.
- "Opened, Closed and Opening: Reflections on Feminist Pedagogy in a UK University". N.paradoxa. 27. KT Press: 20–28. July 2010.
- Pollock, Griselda (September 2016). "Is feminism a trauma, a bad memory, or a virtual future?". Differences: A Journal of Feminist Cultural Studies. 27 (2). Duke University Press: 27–61. doi:10.1215/10407391-3621697.

== See also ==
- Art history
- Avant-garde
- Gender studies
- Feminist art movement in the United States
- Feminist film theory
- Feminist theory
- Film theory
- Cultural studies
- Women's history
