= Naim Attallah =

British businessman (1931–2021)

Naim Attallah CBE
- نعيم إبراهيم عطالله
- Born: Naim Ibrahim Attallah; 1 May 1931; Haifa, Mandatory Palestine
- Died: 2 February 2021 (aged 89)
- Occupations: Businessman and publisher
- Known for: Publisher of Quartet Books and co-owner of The Women's Press
- Spouse: Maria Nykolyn (m. 1957; died 2016)
- Children: 1

Naim Ibrahim Attallah CBE (Arabic: نعيم إبراهيم عطالله; 1 May 1931 – 2 February 2021) was a Palestinian-British businessman and writer. In the early 1970s, he became involved with John Asprey, heir to the luxury goods group, and under his patronage became joint managing director and eventually group chief executive, expanding the company greatly.

Attallah acquired, independently, Quartet Books (1976), The Women's Press (1977) and several magazines, including The Wire, The Oldie and the Literary Review, the last of which lost him, over time, an estimated £2.5m.

== Biography ==
Attallah was born on 1 May 1931 in Haifa, in the British Mandate of Palestine, to a Catholic family. At the age of 18 (in 1949), he was sent to the UK to complete an engineering degree at Battersea Polytechnic, London. This was cut short in 1951, when the Israeli government imposed financial restriction. Leaving university with no means of support, Attallah worked a range of jobs, some--steeplejack, bouncer, factory worker--low waged, but eventually moving for a short period into banking. He began working as a foreign exchange dealer in 1957, and a financial consultant in 1969. In 1967, Atallah incorporated Namara, an umbrella firm that he would use for his later acquisitions.

Attallah joined Asprey in the 1970s. In 1992, he became joint managing director of jewellers, Asprey. He became Chief Executive in 1992. Attallah left Asprey in 1995.

The Standard reporter Penny Perrick wrote: "In his native Palestine Naim Attallah was an only son, sharing a house with his mother, three sisters, his grandmother and aunt, 'Which is perhaps why I feel so at home with them in my working life.'

From 1976, Attallah was the publisher of Quartet Books (David Elliot was the editorial director) and from 1977 he was the joint owner of The Women's Press with Stephanie Dowrick.

Attallah also became a film producer, known for The Slipper and the Rose (1976), Brimstone and Treacle (1982), and Hier is... Adriaan van Dis (1983). Atallah, through his company Namara, also financed the stage adaptation of J. P. Donleavy's, The Beastly Beatitudes of Balthazar B (1981). In 1991, Attallah acquired the Theatre PR company, Theo Cowan Ltd.

The Palestinian-born entrepreneur was described by The Guardian in 2000 as a "legendary adorer of beautiful women". This "adoration" led to his appointment of many women to important roles. Attallah appointed a young Sabrina Guinness to run a new book club, Anna Pasternak to a role at Quartet Books, and broadcaster and columnist Emma Soames, as editor of the Literary Review (followed later by Auberon Waugh. Other mentees included journalist and novelist Candida Crewe, writer and broadcaster Rebecca Fraser, food writer Nigella Lawson, columnist Sophia Sackville-West, and journalist and novelist Daisy Waugh.

Attallah was appointed Commander of the Order of the British Empire (CBE) in the 2017 New Year Honours for services to literature and the arts.

According to Jennie Erdal's 2005 memoir Ghosting, she was the ghostwriter of Attallah's "speeches, newspaper articles, a dozen works of nonfiction and two novels", in addition to "hundreds of letters". The last part of Erdal's book's dedication states that Attallah "inspired this story and allowed it to be told".

Attallah died in his sleep on 2 February 2021, after contracting COVID-19.

== Publishing ==
Atallah was the owner of the publishing house Quartet Books, which had been founded in 1972 by Ken Banerji, John Boothe, William Miller and Brian Thompson, and was taken over by Attallah in 1976 to secure its viability. Attallah was a backer of the Literary Review and The Oldie, investing £120,000 in 1991, rising to £500,000 in its first few years.

Attallah was co-owner of the London-based The Women's Press, established in 1977; it was founded by he and Stephanie Dowrick. Attallah put in £51 of the £100 start up money.

In 1988, Attallah published Women (Quartet), a compilation of interviews with around 300 women on a range of subjects including feminism, sexuality, creativity their experience of motherhood, and their professional lives.

Attallah's book of memoirs, Fulfilment and Betrayal: 1975–1995, was published in 2007.

He was a Fellow of the Royal Society of Authors.

== Books ==
- Memories, Quartet Books, 2020, ISBN 978-0704374799
- A Scribbler in Soho: A Celebration of Auberon Waugh (editor), Quartet Books, 2019, ISBN 978-0704374577
- No Longer With Us: Encounters With Naim Attallah, Quartet Books, 2018, ISBN 978-0704374560
- Fulfilment and Betrayal: 1975–1995, Quartet Books, 2007, ISBN 978-0704371217
- In Touch with his Roots, Quartet Books, 2006, ISBN 978-0704371187
- The Boy in England, Quartet Books, 2005, ISBN 978-0704371170
- The Old Ladies of Nazareth, Quartet Books, 2004, ISBN 978-0704371842
- Dialogues, Quartet Books, 2000, ISBN 978-0704371156
- Insights: An Anthology of Interviews, Quartet Books, 1999, ISBN 978-0704371132
- In Conversation with Naim Attallah, Quartet Books, 1998, ISBN 978-0704380875
- A Woman a Week, Quartet Books, 1998, ISBN 978-0704380868
- Tara and Claire, Quartet Books, 1997, ISBN 978-0704371057
- Asking Questions: An Anthology of Encounters (with Charlotte Smith), Quartet Books, 1996, ISBN 978-0704380271
- A Timeless Passion, Quartet Books, 1995, ISBN 978-0704380189
- Speaking for the Oldie, Quartet Books, 1994, ISBN 978-0704370913
- More of a Certain Age, Quartet Books, 1993, ISBN 978-0704370586
- Of a Certain Age, Quartet Books, 1992, ISBN 978-0704370289
- Singular Encounters, Quartet Books, 1990, ISBN 978-0704327689
- Women, Quartet Books, 1988, ISBN 978-0704300804
