= Ellen Kuzwayo =

South African women's rights activist and politician (1914–2006)

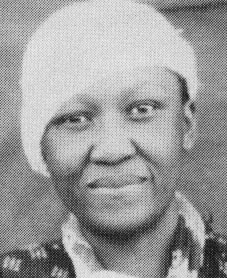
- Born: Nnoseng Ellen Kate Serasengwe; 29 June 1914; Thaba 'Nchu, Orange Free State
- Died: 19 April 2006 (aged 91); Johannesburg, South Africa
- Occupations: Women's rights activist and politician, teacher
- Notable work: Call Me Woman (1985)
- Awards: CNA Award

Nnoseng Ellen Kate Kuzwayo (29 June 1914 – 19 April 2006) was a South African women's rights activist and politician, who was a teacher from 1938 to 1952. She was president of the African National Congress Youth League in the 1960s. In 1994, she was elected to the first post-apartheid South African Parliament. Her autobiography, Call Me Woman (1985), won the CNA Literary Award.

== Early years ==
=== Family background ===
Born Nnoseng Ellen Serasengwe, in Thaba 'Nchu, Orange Free State, Kuzwayo came from an educated, politically active family. Her maternal grandfather, Jeremaiah Makgothi, was taken by his mother from the Orange Free State to the Cape to attend the Lovedale Institute, circa 1875. He qualified as a teacher and also worked as a court interpreter and a Methodist lay preacher. Makgothi was the only layman to work with Robert Moffat on the translation of the Bible into Setswana.^{1}

Both Makgothi and Kuzwayo's father, Philip S. Mefare, were active in politics. Makgothi was secretary of the Orange Free State branch of the South African Native National Congress, Mefare a member of its successor, the African National Congress.

=== Education and career ===
Kuzwayo began her schooling at the school built by Makgothi on his farm in Thabapatchoa, about 12 miles from Tweespruit, Orange Free State. She attended Adams College, Amanzimtoti, and then undertook a teacher training course at Lovedale College in Fort Hare, graduating at the age of 22 and beginning a teaching career. She married Ernest Moloto when in her late twenties, and the couple had two sons, but the marriage was not a happy one, and after suffering abuse from her husband she fled to Johannesburg. She had a part as a shebeen queen, alongside Sidney Poitier in the 1951 film Cry, the Beloved Country. After her first marriage was dissolved, she married Godfrey Kuzwayo in 1950. She worked as a teacher in the Transvaal until 1952, giving up teaching on the introduction of the Bantu Education Act, 1953, which cut back opportunities for black education. She then trained as a social worker (1953–55).

In the 1940s, she served as secretary of the ANC Youth League.

After the 1976 Soweto uprising, she was the only woman on the committee of 10 set up to organise civic affairs in Soweto, and her activities led to her detention for five months in 1977–78 under the Prevention of Terrorism Act. She would recount her arrest in her 1996 testimony to the Truth and Reconciliation Commission. Her other community activism included serving as the president of the Black Consumer Union of South Africa and the Maggie Magaba Trust.

On the 1985 publication of her autobiography, Call Me Woman, in which she described being beaten by her husband, Kuzwayo became the first black writer to win South Africa's leading literary prize, the CNA Award.

After Nelson Mandela was inaugurated as South African president in 1994, Kuzwayo became a member of the country's first multiracial Parliament, aged 79, and served for five years until June 1999, when she was South Africa's longest-serving parliamentarian.

With director Betty Wolpert, Kuzwayo was involved in making the documentary films Awake from Mourning (1982) and Tsiamelo –– A Place of Goodness (1983), which drew on the story of the dispossession of her family's farmland.

Kuzwayo died in Johannesburg, aged 91, of complications from diabetes, survived by her sons, Bobo and Justice Moloto, grandchildren and great-grandchildren.

== Awards and recognition ==
In 1979, Ellen Kuzwayo was named Woman of the Year by the Johannesburg newspaper The Star, and was nominated again in 1984. In 1987, she was awarded an honorary doctorate of Laws from the University of the Witwatersrand, the first black woman to receive an honorary degree from the university. She also awarded honorary doctorates by the University of Natal and the University of Port Elizabeth. She was awarded the Order of Meritorious Service by Nelson Mandela in 1999.

A South African marine research ship was named after her, the Ellen Khuzwayo, launched in 2007.

== Works ==
- Call Me Woman. London: The Women's Press (1985). ISBN 1-879960-09-5, reprinted Aunt Lute Books, 1992
- Sit Down and Listen: Stories from South Africa, London: The Women's Press, 1990. ISBN 978-0704342309
