= Kinflicks =

Novel by Lisa Alther

- First edition (US)
- Author: Lisa Alther
- Language: English
- Genre: Novel
- Publisher: Knopf (US); Chatto & Windus (UK)
- Publication date: 1976
- Publication place: United States
- Media type: Print
- Pages: 503
- ISBN: 0-394-49836-4
- OCLC: 1958211
- Dewey Decimal: 813/.5/4
- LC Class: PZ4.A4674 Ki3 PS3551.L78
- Followed by: Original Sins

Kinflicks (1976) is a novel by American writer Lisa Alther. It was Alther's first published work, and the "subject of considerable pre-publication hyperbole."

== Plot summary ==
The novel starts with a first-person reflection on her life so far by the protagonist, Virginia "Ginny" Hull Babcock Bliss, as she catches a plane to look after her gravely ill mother. From then on, dated chapters in third person alternate with Ginny's non-linear first-person reminiscences of her childhood, her teenage years, her college years, her marriage, and beyond.

== Publication ==
The first printing consisted of 30,000 copies, and was chosen as an alternate selection of the Book of the Month Club. It was "the subject of considerable pre-publication hyperbole..., soaring in the slip stream of Fear of Flying, Erica Jong's bestselling hymn to the body electric. The novel proves again—if any doubters still remain—that women can write about physical functions just as frankly and, when the genes move them, as raunchily as men. It strikes a blow for the picara by putting a heroine through the same paces that once animated a Tom Jones or a Holden Caulfield. And it suggests that life seen from what was once called the distaff side suspiciously resembles the genitalia-centered existence that male novelists have so long monopolized."

== Critical reception ==
Nobel laureate Doris Lessing wrote of Kinflicks that Alther was "a strong, salty, original talent."

Time called it an "abundantly entertaining progress through the unsettled 60s" and noted that "as exuberant caricature Kinflicks is authentically inspired"; while the novel "teems with cartoon eccentrics mouthing balloonfuls of inflated nonsense[, u]nhappily, Ginny [the protagonist] is equally one dimensional."

More than 30 years after its publication, Katherine Dieckmann, reviewing the author's 2007 memoir, also commented on Kinflicks, calling it a "raucous novel [that] was all the rage among my high school set for its lurid paperback cover (nude female back, gilt lettering) and its frank talk of erections and lesbian hook-ups. Revisiting the novel 30 years later, it’s clear the packaging sold the contents short: Alther’s best-known book is a witty coming-of-age tale in which a tart-tongued protagonist named Ginny wanders her way through an identity crisis, mostly against a classic counterculture background."
