= Requiem (Gō novel) =

Requiem Rekuiemu (れくいえむ) is a 1972 semi-autobiographical novel by Japanese author Shizuko Gō. It was originally published in Bungakukai in 1972, and won the Akutagawa Prize in the same year. It was published as a full volume in Japan in 1973, and translated into English by Geraldine Harcourt in 1983.

== Synopsis ==
16 year old Setsuko Oizumi works in an ammunition factory in war-torn Japan. The novel opens with Setsuko near death after a firebombing in Yokohama. The novel switches between past and present, showing Setsuko's transformation from an idealist who supported the war to a hardened realist who contracts tuberculosis. Throughout the novel Setsuko is paralleled with Naomi, a classmate who originally opposed the war because of her nonconformist family but (with Setsuko's encouragement) became a fervent supporter of the war. Over the course of the novel the two characters switch ideological positions while writing letters to each other in a grey notebook. Many of Setsuko's family and friends die throughout the novel, and Setsuko herself also dies just as the war ends.

== Critical reception ==
Marilyn Jeanne Miller wrote for World Literature Today that the novel has a "compelling story and subtle craft in telling will speak to everyone". She also wrote that the use of a notebook-based narrative was "fine-honed into a marvelously vibrant, gripping fictional technique." Kris Kosaka of the Japan Times wrote that the novel "realistically portrays [...] conflicting emotions" when paralleling Setsuko's experience with Naomi's. However, Kosaka also points out the indifference of war, and that both young women die by the end of the novel. Charles Solomon of the Los Angeles Times notes that the letters, memories, and conversations between Naomi and Setsuko that make up the novel reads like "a mosaic wrought from the shattered pieces of the heroine's tragically brief life.
