= Gill Perry =

Art historian

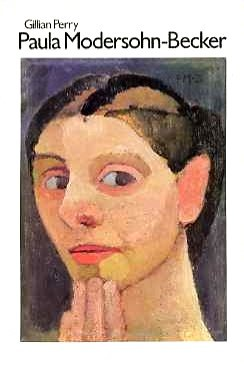
Paula Modersohn-Becker: Her life and work by Gill Perry, 1979.

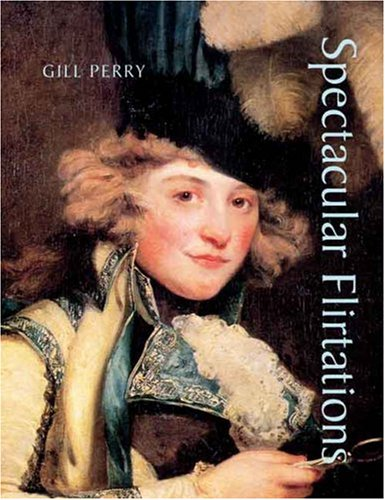
The cover of Spectacular flirtations (2007) featuring Mrs. Jordan in the Character of Hippolyta by John Hoppner, 1791.

Gillian Perry is professor of history of art at the Open University. She is a specialist in eighteenth century portraiture and has written two books on the actress in art. In 2011/12 she curated the exhibition The First Actresses at the National Portrait Gallery in London which was widely reviewed.

== Education ==
Perry studied at the University of Sussex from 1968 to 1972, graduating with a first class Bachelor of Arts degree in art history and French.

== Career ==
Perry joined the Open University in 1977. She began her D.Phil. on the topic of Paula Modersohn-Becker and Worpswede 1876-1907 under the supervision of John Röhl of the University of Sussex in 1978 but submitted her thesis on the topic of Paula Modersohn-Becker and Worpswede 1889-1907 for the degree of M.Phil. in 1984. Her research into Modersohn-Becker formed the subject of her first book which was published by the Women's Press in 1979.

Perry was head of the department of art history at the Open University from 2005 to 2008, and head of research from 2005 to 2009. She is currently professor in art history there.

Perry is a specialist in eighteenth-century portraiture and has written two books on the actress in art. In 2011–12, she curated the exhibition The First Actresses: Nell Gwyn to Sarah Siddons at the National Portrait Gallery in London, supported by Lucy Peltz.

== Selected publications ==
- Paula Modersohn-Becker: Her life and work. Women's Press, 1979. ISBN 0704328267
- Women artists and the Parisian avant-garde: Modernism and 'feminine' art 1900-1920s. Manchester University Press, Manchester, 1995. ISBN 0719041643
- Spectacular flirtations: Viewing the actress in British art and theatre, 1768-1820. Yale University Press, New Haven, 2007. ISBN 978-0-300-13544-2.
- The first actresses: Nell Gwyn to Sarah Siddons. National Portrait Gallery and University of Michigan Press, London, 2011. (With Joseph Roach & Shearer West) ISBN 978-185514-411-8
- Playing at home: The house in contemporary art. Reaktion Books, London, 2013. ISBN 9781780231808
