= Fettouma Touati =

Algerian-French novelist

Fettouma Touati (born 1950) is an Algerian-French novelist writing in French.

== Life ==
Fettouma Touati was born in Azazga, a small mountainous village in the Kabylia region of Algeria. Her parents emigrated to France in 1951, before the Algerian War of Independence. In 1975 she returned to Kabylia for four years, and worked as a librarian in the University of Tizi Ouzou.

Her novel Le printemps désespéré (Desperate Spring) charted the lives of three generations of Algerian women, highlighting the way in which a network of women's relationships supported them in coping with the recurrent racism and sexism suffered by Algerian women.

== Works ==
- Le printemps désespéré: vies d'Algériennes. 1984. Translated into English by Ros Schwartz as Desperate Spring, The Women's Press, 1987.
