= Verena Stefan =

Verena Stefan (3 October 1947 – 29 November 2017) was a Swiss-born feminist and writer living in Germany, later in Canada.

She was born in Bern and moved to Berlin in 1968 to become a physical therapist and study sociology at the Free University of Berlin. Her first book Häutungen (Sheddings) (1975) was based on her experiences living in Berlin. It was reprinted by lesbian feminist publisher Daughters, Inc. in 1978. In 1980, she published a book of poems Mit Füßen, mit Flügeln (With feet, with wings).

With Gabriele Meixner, she has published German translations of Dream of a Common Language by Adrienne Rich and Lesbian Peoples by Monique Wittig. Stefan has also published essays on writing for Die Zeit and Frauenoffensive.

She lived together with Lise Moisan and died in Montreal on 29 November 2017.
