= Mary Wings =

American novelist (1949–2024)

Mary Wings (born Mary Lee Geller; April 14, 1949 – July 3, 2024) was an American cartoonist, writer, and artist. She was known for highlighting lesbian themes in her work. In 1973, she made history by releasing Come Out Comix, the first lesbian comic book. She also wrote a series of detective novels featuring lesbian heroine Emma Victor. Divine Victim, Wings' only Gothic novel, won the Lambda Literary Award for Lesbian Mystery in 1994.

== Early life and education ==
Mary Wings was born on April 14, 1949, in Chicago, Illinois as Mary Lee Geller. She later changed her last name to Wings, "inspired by the adage that 'friendship is love with wings'", according to The New York Times.

Wings was raised in the Baháʼí Faith in Chicago. She attended Shimer College, a Great Books college then located in the town of Mount Carroll, Illinois. Later, she studied ceramics at Museum Art College in Portland, Oregon. She also studied theater set design at San Francisco State University.

== Career ==
Wings was known for her work in lesbian-themed comics and mystery novels. Her work was driven generally by the desire to discuss underrepresented topics that are relevant to her personal life. Initially, she did not intend to publish any of her work.

=== Comics ===
Wings was not originally a cartoonist or part of the 1970s underground comix movement when she created her first comic book, Come Out Comix. This comic book was created in response to Trina Robbins' comic in Wimmen's Comix #1, "Sandy Comes Out" — the first comic about lesbians. Wings was angered by "Sandy Comes Out," believing that the complex process of coming out was misrepresented by Robbins, a straight woman. She wrote Come Out Comix in seven days. Wings self-published Come Out Comix, printing copies in the basement of a karate studio. The plot of this comic book focuses on the character Maggi, who is coming to terms with her lesbian identity and finding a lover in the process. Come Out Comix is influenced by the author's own experience of coming out. Wings was also attributed with creating the first homosexual non-erotic comic book because comic books pre-dating Wings often fetishized any homosexual themes.

Wings later published two other comic books, Dyke Shorts and Are Your Highs Getting You Down?. The latter, Are Your Highs Getting You Down, was funded by a California Arts Council grant in 1979, tackled the growing issue of drug addiction and abuse. She also contributed to Howard Cruse's publication, Gay Comix. She wrote comic strips for issue numbers one and two.

Her comics became very popular in the lesbian community. Rather than simply including lesbian characters in her comics, she addressed themes specific to the community such as coming out, artificial insemination, discovering your parents' homosexuality, and writing lesbians into history. Because of her open addressing of homosexuality, her comic books were controversial. Notably, a shipment of her books were seized at the border of Canada due to the content.

=== Novels ===
Colors of Mexico (Mary Wings, 2007)

Although Wings started her career in comics, she later longed to create more complex plot lines, leading her to pursue fiction through novels rather than comics.

Lesbian detective fiction first appeared in 1984 in response to the decline of the coming out story and the assertion of lesbian identity as separate from feminist theory. Wings was one of the originators of lesbian detective fiction, publishing her first mystery novel, She Came Too Late, in England in 1986 and the United States in 1988. She Came Too Late was a success and gave Wings notoriety as the book appeared for seven weeks on the London City Limits Bestseller List and won Best Novel of the Year in the 1986 Reader's Poll. She later wrote four other mysteries starring the same lesbian detective, Emma Victor.

Wings's only standalone novel, Divine Victim, is a lesbian mystery-thriller that won the 1994 Lambda Literary Award for Lesbian Mystery.

=== Later projects ===
Wings worked on a new comics project entitled Old. She created this comic in response to the lack of content appealing to people her age. She also hoped to fight stigmas related to ageism. Her comic may include paper doll cut-outs reminiscent of early comics for women.

Wings discussed her work in news articles, and on podcasts. She gave talks at art schools on panels with artists like Trina Robbins and Lee Marrs.

== Personal life ==
Wings first heard the term lesbian when she was 19 years old, and she came out at age 21. Her mother did not understand Wings's identity, and she begged Wings not to tell her father.

Her mother died when Wings was in her mid-twenties after unexpectedly being diagnosed with pancreatic cancer.

Around this time, Wings published Come Out Comix and her sexuality was made known to the public. Due to the Briggs Initiative, Wings feared that her open lesbianism would bar her from ever becoming a teacher in California, a childhood dream of hers.

Wings also played the banjo in a band called Robin, Woody and Wings with Robin Flower and Woody Simmons. After her mother's death, Wings moved with her band to San Francisco. She later left the band.

In 1980, Wings left San Francisco and moved to the Netherlands where she became fluent in Dutch.

In 1987, Wings returned to San Francisco after the publication of her first novel. Upon her return, she became once again active with gay and lesbian causes, participating in the San Francisco Gay and Lesbian History Project and the Frameline Film Festival.

Wings died from lung cancer at her home in San Francisco, on July 3, 2024, at the age of 75.

== Bibliography ==
=== Comic books ===
- Come Out Comix (1973)
- Dyke Shorts (1978)
- Are Your Highs Getting You Down? (1980)

=== Other comics contributions ===
- "A Visit From Mom" published in Gay Comix #1: Lesbians and Gay Men Put It On Paper! (1980)
- "Child Labor" published in Gay Comix #2: One Step Ahead of the Homophobes! (1981)

=== Novels ===
Divine Victim (1993) - Lambda Literary Award for Lesbian Mystery winner

Emma Victor series

- She Came Too Late (1986)
- She Came in a Flash (1988)
- She Came by the Book (1995)
- She Came to the Castro (1997)
- She Came in Drag (1999)

=== Short stories ===
- "Kill the Man for Me" published in A Women's Eye fiction collection (1992)
- "Mars Bar" published in Out/Look magazine

=== Lectures ===
- A Woman of Affairs with historian Eric Garber (1993) — The Life of Greta Garbo
