= Joan Riley =

Jamaican-British author (born 1958)

- Born: 26 May 1958 (age 68); Hopewell, Richmond, St. Mary, Jamaica
- Education: University of Sussex; University of London
- Occupation: Writer
- Notable work: The Unbelonging; A Kindness to the Children

Joan Riley (born 26 May 1958) is a Jamaican-British writer. Her 1985 debut novel The Unbelonging made her "the first Afro-Caribbean woman author to write about the experiences of Blacks in England".

== Biography ==
Joan Riley was born in Hopewell, Richmond, St. Mary, Jamaica, the youngest of eight children (six girls and two boys), and was raised by her father after her mother died in childbirth. She received her early education on that island before migrating in 1976 to the United Kingdom. There she studied social work at the University of Sussex and the University of London. She has worked at a drugs advisory agency and wrote about the experiences of Caribbean women.

Riley is the author of four novels; her first, The Unbelonging, published in 1985, is considered the first by a woman about the black experience in Britain. Riley was awarded the Voice award for her work in 1992, and the MIND prize in 1993 for A Kindness to the Children.

She has been featured in such anthologies as Daughters of Africa (edited by Margaret Busby, 1992) and Her True-True Name (edited by Pamela Mordecai, 1989). Riley co-edited with Briar Wood Leave to Stay: Stories of Exile and Belonging (Virago, 1996), a collection of fiction and poetry by writers from India, the Caribbean, China, South Africa, the USSR, Canada, Australia and Pakistan, including Sujata Bhatt, Fred D'Aguiar, Michael Donaghy, Jane Duran, Michael Hoffman, Aamer Hussein, Mimi Khalvati, Adam Lively, Sindiwe Magona, Bharati Mukherjee, Hanan al-Shaykh, Janice Shinebourne and Zinovy Zinik.

== Bibliography ==
Novels

- The Unbelonging (London: The Women's Press, 1985)
- Waiting in the Twilight (London: The Women's Press, 1987)
- Romance (London: The Women's Press, 1988; new edition 1997)
- A Kindness to the Children (London: The Women's Press, 1992)
