= Sheila Ernst =

British psychotherapist (1941–2015)

Sheila Hyah Sarah Ernst (25 July 1941 – 6 February 2015) was a British psychotherapist who helped to develop a radical feminist approach to group analysis.

== Biography ==
Ernst was born in London to Jewish parents from Palestine who trained as doctors and worked with children from concentration camps. At the age of 8 Ernst was sent to the progressive boarding school Dartington Hall and later studied moral sciences and history at Newnham College, Cambridge. The tensions and experiences within Ernst's formative years helped in the development of her deeply empathetic and political approach to psychotherapy. She worked in collaboration with others to establish a different approach to psychotherapy, helped establish and develop therapeutic centres, authored many books and worked in many different countries to support others to learn these new techniques. In 1964, Ernst married Robert M. Young, with whom she lived for a time in a commune in Chesterton. In later years, she suffered from the neurodegenerative condition, progressive supranuclear palsy, and ended her life at Dignitas in Switzerland.

== Research and work ==
She approached therapy from a political dimension, seeing ‘the personal is political’ moving away for just concentrating on the individual as the source of the issue. Ernst's feminist approach to group analysis explored the external political and social world affects the individual. She taught at Birkbeck College on the Psychodynamic Counselling Course and created academic links to support the development of her therapeutic approach.

In 1981, Ernst co authored 'In Our Own Hands' with Lucy Goodison which contained practical methods for running self-help groups which was drawn from experiences of helping to setting up the Red Therapy group.

Ernst co-authored 'An Introduction to Groupwork' in 1999. This text book provides details of a process for establishing and conducting a group work for therapists or those supporting therapeutic groups, such as nurses, doctors and other professionals, in a variety of contexts. It does this by leading the group through exploring each member's experiences of groups, including the family. It seeks to uncover why things work as the do within groups, through the social, cultural and institutional dimensions within and outside of the group. This book is now considered a key work in this area, and goes far beyond the idea of an introduction.

She worked at and helped to develop the Women's Therapy Centre in London set up by fellow feminists and psychotherapists Luise Eichenbaum and Susie Orbach in 1976. This centre became a model copied around the world, and help helped thousands of women suffering from mental health issues. It closed in 2019 because of a lack of funding. In 1987 she co-edited Living with the Sphinx: Papers from the Women's Therapy Centre, with Marie Maguire. She worked with groups around the world including Russia, Northern Ireland and Israel. She help support groups in St. Petersburg, Russia where political suppression had its affects on the mind and personality. She was a consultant at the Medical Foundation for the Victims of Torture during a period of expansion at the centre.
