= Shizuko Gō =

Japanese novelist

Shizuko Gō (郷静子; April 20, 1929–September 30, 2014) was a Japanese novelist. She was best known for her 1972 novel Requiem, which won the Akutagawa Prize.

== Biography ==
Gō was born Michiko Yamaguchi in Yokohama, Japan on April 20, 1929. She graduated from Tsurumi Kōtō Joshi Gakkō. During World War II she worked in a factory instead of going to college, like many other people her age at the time. After the war she contracted tuberculosis, and was sent to a temple in the countryside to heal by her family. After two years. Gō had recovered enough to find a job and return to her normal life. She began writing in 1949. However, her tuberculosis recurred regularly until she eventually had to have a lung removed in 1955. She married Ikuzō Ōshima soon after the surgery, and stopped writing to raise her family.

Gō began writing again in 1968, after the Japanese Self Defense Force announced its new budget. She wrote her best-known novel, Requiem (れくいえむ), after the announcement. It is a semi-autobiographical work that takes place during World War II, and follows a young woman who works in a factory and contracts tuberculosis. The story was originally published in Bungakukai in 1972, and won the Akutagawa Prize. She wrote several other novels after that success that also had anti-war themes. She even went to the Philippines in 1984 to conduct research for her 1986 story Midoriiro no Yami (緑色の闇), which was about a Japanese family in Manila during World War II.

Gō became more politically active in the anti-war and peace movements, especially in 1982 when she wrote a piece in the Asahi Shinbun against the United States and Japan's military exercises near Mount Fuji. She also wrote about Japan's inconsistent and corrupt education system in some of her fiction and nonfiction works.

Gō died of old age in Yokohama on September 30, 2014.

== Selected works ==
- Requiem (1972)
- Chiisana Umi to Sora (小さな海と空), 1975
- Wagaya no Doronko Kyōiku (わが家の泥んこ教育), 1976
