= Rozsika Parker =

Mixed-ethnicity British historian

- Born: 27 December 1945; London, United Kingdom
- Died: 5 November 2010 (aged 64)
- Known for: Painting
- Movement: Psychotherapy, Art History
- Partner: Andrew Samuels

Rozsika Parker (27 December 1945 – 5 November 2010) was a British psychotherapist, art historian and writer and a feminist.

== Biography ==
Parker was born in London and spent her early years in Oxford, studying at Wychwood School.

Between the years 1966–1969, Parker studied for a degree in the history of European art at the Courtauld Institute in London. In 1972, she joined the feminist magazine Spare Rib. She and Griselda Pollock then went on to found a feminist group, The Feminist Art History Collective.

In the 1980s, Parker had two children with the Jungian analyst Andrew Samuels, a boy and a girl.

Parker died in 2010 at age 64 of cancer.

== Legacy ==
In 2013, the Rozsika Parker Essay Prize was established by the British Journal of Psychotherapy.

Parker's contention that embroidery was a way to educate women and a weapon for resistance helped develop computational fiber arts as Anastasia Salter notes in her essay, Re:traced Threads: Generating Feminist Textile Art with Tracery.

== Books ==
- Old Mistresses: Women, Art and Ideology, with Griselda Pollock (1981)
- The Subversive Stitch: Embroidery and the Making of the Feminine (1984)
- Framing Feminism: Art and the Women's Movement 1970–1985 (1987)
- The Subversive Stitch: Embroidery and the Making of the Feminine (1989)
- Torn in Two: Experience of Maternal Ambivalence (1995)
- Mother Love, Mother Hate: The Power of Maternal Ambivalence (1996)
- The Anxious Gardener (2006)
