= Joan Barfoot =

Canadian novelist (born 1946)

Joan Louise Barfoot (born May 17, 1946) is a Canadian novelist. She has published 11 novels, including Luck (2005), which was a nominee for the 2005 Scotiabank Giller Prize, and Critical Injuries (2001), which was longlisted for the 2002 Man Booker Prize. Her latest novel, Exit Lines, was published in 2009.

== Life and career ==
Joan Barfoot was born on May 17, 1946, in Owen Sound, Ontario, and graduated with a degree in English from the University of Western Ontario in 1969. She worked as a reporter and editor for various newspapers in Ontario including the Windsor Star, the Toronto Sun and the London Free Press. As a child, while she and her mother watched a squirrel in their back yard from their kitchen, her mother told Barfoot to tell her the squirrel's story and she'd write it down. Barfoot doesn't remember the story but remembers her delight when her mother read the story back to her and the power of creating it. Barfoot was also encouraged to write by a teacher who told Barfoot she wrote well and to consider some word-related career. In addition to writing Barfoot occasionally teaches creative writing classes though she believes writing ought to be an entirely private pleasure and a puzzle. She lives in London, Ontario.

In 1978, her novel Abra (published as Gaining Ground in the England) won the Books in Canada First Novel Award (now the Amazon.ca First Novel Award). The narrator "leaves husband and family to go live on her own in a bush farm," as Dave Godfrey outlines in his book review in Books in Canada. As Patricia Craig describes her in The Times Literary Supplement in 1980, Abra "chooses...without obvious motivation, to cut herself off from all the social props supposed to enrich a woman's daily existence...." The "absconding mother" figure is an "assertion of autonomy" rather than a "plea for understanding", Craig observes.

In 1986, her second novel, Dancing in the Dark (1982), became a film of the same name, starring Martha Henry. It won three Genie Awards, including Best Art Direction, Best Adapted Screenplay, and Best Performance by an Actress in a Leading Role. Dancing in the Dark is a novel about the reflection of a criminally insane woman who is serving time in prison for the murder of her unfaithful husband. She explains her reasoning for the murder throughout the novel while looking for psychological freedom.

Barfoot's work has been compared internationally with that of Anne Tyler, Carol Shields, Margaret Drabble, Fay Weldon and Margaret Atwood.

In 1992, she won the Marian Engel Award, presented each year by the Writers' Trust of Canada to a female Canadian novelist who is in the middle of her career.

== Critical commentary ==
In 2005, the Giller jury committee, describing Luck, wrote that "Joan Barfoot is at the peak of her powers with this splendidly realized tragicomedy about a household in the wake of an unexpected death. With its note-perfect narration, mordant wit and wonderfully neurotic cast of characters, Luck shows how death can reveal life in all its absurdity and complexity. This scintillating comedy of manners is also a profound meditation on fate, love, and artifice."

== Prizes and honours ==
- 1978 Books in Canada First Novel Award, for Abra
- 1992 Marian Engel Award
- 2001 Shortlist, Trillium Book Award, for Critical Injuries
- 2002 Longlist, Man Booker Prize, for Critical Injuries
- 2005 Nominee, Scotiabank Giller Prize, for Luck
- 2005 Huron University College medal of distinction

== Bibliography ==
- Abra (1978) (UK title: Gaining Ground) McGraw-Hill Ryerson
- Dancing in the Dark (1982) Macmillan of Canada
- Duet for Three (1985) ISBN 0-7715-9680-4
- Family News (1989)
- Plain Jane (1992)
- Charlotte and Claudia Keeping in Touch (1994)
- Some Things About Flying (1997) Key Porter Books
- Getting Over Edgar (1999) Key Porter Books ISBN 1-55263-011-0
- Critical Injuries (2001) Key Porter Books
- Luck (2005) Alfred Knopf Canada ISBN 0-676-97700-6
- Exit Lines (2009) Alfred Knopf Canada ISBN 978-0-307-37172-0
