= Lisa Alther =

American author and novelist

- Born: July 23, 1944 (age 82); Kingsport, Tennessee, U.S.
- Education: Wellesley College (BA)
- Occupations: Author; novelist
- Children: 1
- Website: www.lisaalther.com

Lisa Alther (born July 23, 1944) is an American author and novelist.

== Personal life ==
Alther was born in Kingsport, Tennessee, in 1944. Her father was a surgeon, while her mother was a homemaker. She has three brothers and a sister.

She graduated from Wellesley College with a B.A. in English literature in 1966. She then attended the Publishing Procedures Course at Radcliffe College.

After graduation Alther worked briefly for Atheneum Publishers in New York before moving to rural Vermont. Alther wrote fiction steadily for years, without success, collecting more than 250 rejection slips without getting published. She was stubborn however, and determined to succeed. When she finally succeeded, with Kinflicks in 1975, the novel was phenomenally successful.

Alther now divides her time among East Tennessee, Vermont, and New York City. She has one daughter.

== Career ==
Alther is the author of six contemporary novels, Kinflicks, Original Sins, Other Women, Bedrock, Five Minutes In Heaven, and Swan Song, as well as a small number of published short stories and many magazine articles. She also wrote Washed in the Blood, a three-part historical novel concerning the earliest European settlement of the southern Appalachians. All of her novels include lesbian or bisexual women characters. She is also known for her humor writing.

She has also written two non-fiction books, Kinfolks: Falling Off the Family Tree—the Search for My Melungeon Ancestors (2007; ISBN 1-55970-832-8) and Blood Feud: The Hatfields and the McCoys: The Epic Story of Murder and Vengeance (2012; ISBN 978-0762779185).

Alther has taught Southern fiction at Saint Michael's College in Winooski, Vermont, and at East Tennessee State University, where she was awarded the Basler Chair.

Between 1978 and 1980, Alther lived in London, where she became friends with Doris Lessing. Lessing took an interest in Kinflicks and helped get the work published in London through a contact at Alfred A. Knopf.

It was through Lessing that Alther met the writer, thinker and teacher of Sufi mysticism, Idries Shah. Shah had adapted many Sufi classical works and teaching stories for contemporary readers, and, taking a great interest in these works, Alther read them all, and she also wrote reviews for Shah's books, such as World Tales. In 2020 Alther received the Idries Shah Foundation Award for Human Achievement for “contributions to literature.”

== Bibliography ==
- Kinflicks (1975)
- Original Sins (1981) (Note: Review by Carolyn Clay in The Boston Phoenix (7 July 1981),)
- Other Women (1985) (Note: Briefly reviewed in the January 21, 1985 issue of The New Yorker, p.94.)
- Bedrock (1990)
- Five Minutes In Heaven (1995)
- Kinfolks: Falling Off the Family Tree--the Search for My Melungeon Ancestors (2007)
- Washed in the Blood (2011)
- Blood Feud: The Hatfields and the McCoys: The Epic Story of Murder and Vengeance (2012)
- About Women: Conversations between a Writer and a Painter (2015)
- Swan Song: An Odyssey (2020)

———————

Bibliography notes
