= Lucy Goodison =

British archaeologist (born 1945)

Lucy Goodison (born 1945) is a British writer who has combined work as an archaeologist of the prehistoric Aegean, with involvement in the practice and teaching of body psychotherapy and engagement with issues of social justice. She has focused on actively challenging the mind/body split and bridging the divide between thinking and feeling that is basic to the western world view. Her books include: Death, Women and the Sun: Symbolism of Regeneration in Early Aegean Religion; Moving Heaven and Earth: Sexuality, Spirituality and Social Change; and Holy Trees and Other Ecological Surprises.

== Career ==
Lucy Goodison was educated at Bushey Grammar School and Newnham College, Cambridge, where she graduated in Classics and Modern & Medieval Languages. She obtained a PhD in Classical Archaeology from University College, London. She has been an Honorary Research Fellow of University College, London; a Leverhulme Research Fellow; and a Phyllis and Eileen Gibbs Travelling Research Fellow of Newnham College, Cambridge.

She started work in the media, as staff scriptwriter for the BBC World Service, then as writer and director of historical and archaeological documentaries for ‘Chronicle’ on BBC-TV. She retained an interest in film and the arts, but her subsequent career followed three main concurrent and intertwined trajectories: as an independent scholar specializing in prehistoric Aegean and early Greek religion; as a practitioner, workshop leader and trainer in body therapies; and as an activist in community campaigns, especially around health, mental health and disability. These different strands of activity have informed her writings, which range from academic texts to journalism and books for the lay reader on self-help therapy and on symbolic, somatic and social issues.

Her earliest archaeological work, the monograph Death Women and the Sun: Symbolism of Regeneration in Early Aegean Religion, presented an innovative synthesis of evidence for the importance of the sun in Aegean religion; she is also concerned with investigation of other physical aspects of prehistoric religion, especially in funerary rituals at the Mesara-type tombs of Minoan Crete. She has been an advocate of integrating sensory, spiritual and social awareness in the consideration of ancient lives, and has published numerous academic papers on various aspects of early Aegean religion. From 1990 to 1997, she was an occasional Lecturer for the British Museum (Education Service); from 2001 to 2004, she taught Modern Greek in Adult Education; and she has lectured nationally and internationally on the iconography and embodied/performative ritual practices of prehistoric Crete.

Concurrently she trained in, and ran a 25-year private practice in, therapeutic massage; has been a practitioner and teacher of bodywork therapies; and has campaigned around special education, self-help therapy and the National Health Service. Her work in these fields has included (1977–1988) as a Workshop Leader at The Women's Therapy Centre in London; 1988–1991 as Information Worker for Mencap in London; 1997–2001 as a Dance Therapist (currently a Registered Dance Movement Psychotherapist) in the Drug Addiction Unit at Holloway Prison, London; and 1979–2003 as occasional tutor of self-help therapy, massage, dance, dreamwork and disability issues in Adult Education, including at the Mary Ward Centre, The Open Centre, Shoreditch Health Centre and Westminster Pastoral Foundation in London, and the Dorset Adult Education Service. In this field, she has authored several books and a number of articles, including for The Guardian, Social Work Today, Open Mind, Psychotherapy and Politics International and Health Service Journal. Her 1981 book In Our Own Hands: A Book of Self-help Therapy (co-authored with Sheila Ernst) clarified the possibilities for choice and autonomy for those undertaking therapy, and became a Time Out and City Limits Alternative Bestseller; her writings on disability and special education were used as teaching materials by the Open University.

An ongoing interest in iconography, literature and performance in the field of the contemporary arts has been reflected in occasional work, including at Inter-Action Community Arts Trust, 1970–1972; as co-director and administrator of Reportage Photo Library, 1991–1994; a continuing involvement in writing and performing in community dance and topical street theatre; and work since 2010 as a co-ordinator of the non-profit imprint Just Press, publishing alternative titles ranging from studies of early documentary photographers to histories of radical theatre.

== Selected publications ==
=== Writings on archaeology and history ===
==== Books ====
- Holy Trees and Other Ecological Surprises, Just Press, 2010.
- Ancient Goddesses: The Myths and the Evidence, British Museum Press, 1998, co-edited with Christine E. Morris.
- Moving Heaven and Earth: Sexuality, Spirituality and Social Change, The Women's Press, 1990.
- Death, Women and the Sun: Symbolism of Regeneration in Early Aegean Religion, Institute of Classical Studies, 1989.

==== Articles and chapters ====
- "'Seeing' Stars... or Suns?" in Aegaeum 44 (Neoteros), 2020, 169–179.
- "Journeys with Death: Spatial Analysis of the Mesara-type Tombs of Prehistoric Crete", in Unlocking Sacred Landscapes: Spatial Analysis of Ritual and Cult in the Mediterranean, edited by G Papantoniou, C. E. Morris and A. K. Vionis, Åström Editions, 2019, 121–138.
- "Thoughts about Light and Water at the Oval House of Chamaizi", in Von Kreta nach Kuba: Gedenkschrift zu Ehren des Berliner Archäologen Veit Stürmer, edited by K. Müller, B. Schiller and Der Fachschaftsrat des Winkelmann-Instituts der Humboldt-Universität zu Berlin, Logos Verlag Berlin GmbH, 2018, 101–119.
- "Sunlight, Divination, and the Dead in Aegean Ritual Tradition", in The Oxford Handbook of Light in Archaeology, edited by C. Papadopoulos and H. Moyes, Oxford University Press, 2017 (online), 1–25.
- "Where did the Mesara-type Tombs Travel From?" in Proceedings of 12th International Congress of Cretan Studies, Heraklion 21st–25th September 2016 (online), 1–15.
- "Goddesses in Prehistory", in A Companion to Gender Prehistory, edited by D. Bolger, John Wiley and Sons, 2013, 265–287, with Christine Morris.
- "'Nature', the Minoans and Embodied Spiritualities", in Archaeology of Spiritualities, edited by K. Rountree, C. Morris and A. A. D. Peatfield, Springer, 2012, 207–225.
- "At Death’s Door: New Evidence and New Narratives from the Mesara-type Tombs", in Proceedings of the 11th International Congress of Cretan Studies, Rethymnon, 21st–27th October 2011, 277–293.
- "'Why All this About Oak or Stone?': Trees and Boulders in Minoan Religion", in Archaeologies of Cult: Essays on Ritual and Cult in Crete in Honor of Geraldine C Gesell, edited by A. L. D'Agata and A. Van de Moortel, American School of Classical Studies at Athens, 2009, 51–57.
- "Gender, Body and the Minoans: Contemporary and Prehistoric Perceptions", in Aegaeum 30 (Fylo) 2009, 233–241.
- "Horizon and Body: Some Aspects of Cycladic Symbolism", in Orizon: A Colloquium on the Prehistory of the Cyclades, edited by N Brodie, J Doole, G Gavalas and C Renfrew, McDonald Institute for Archaeological Research 2008, 417–431.
- "Wearing Wings and Falling: Ikaros in Archaeology?", in Proceedings of the 10th International Congress of Cretan Studies, Chania, 1–8 October 2006, 579–596.
- "Beyond Feasting: Activities with Animals at the Mesara-type Tombs", in Proceedings of the 10th International Congress of Cretan Studies, Chania, 1–8 October 2006, 179–195.
- "A New Catalogue of the Mesara-type Tombs", in Studi Micenei ed Egeo-Anatolici 47, 2005, 171–212, with Carlos Guarita.
- "From Tholos Tomb to Throne Room: Some considerations of Dawn Light and Directionality in Minoan Buildings", in Knossos: Palace, City, State, edited by G. Cadogan, E. Hatzaki and A. Vasilakis, British School at Athens, 2004, 339–350.
- "Helen Waterhouse and her 'Priest-Kings?' paper", in Cretan Studies Vol. 7, 2002, 89–96, with Helen Hughes-Brock.
- "Divination with Water: A Diachronic Perspective", in Proceedings of the 9th International Congress of Cretan Studies, Elounda, 1–6 October 2001, 369–383.
- "Re-constructing Dialogues with the Dead", in Proceedings of the 9th International Congress of Cretan Studies, Elounda, 1–6 October 2001, 325–340.
- "From Tholos Tomb to Throne Room: Perceptions of the Sun in Minoan Ritual", in Aegaeum 22 (Potnia), 2001, 77–88.
- "Theatre of the Sun" with photographs by Carlos Guarita, in The Independent on Sunday, April 2000.
- "A Female Sun Deity in the Bronze Age Aegean?", in Bulletin of the Institute of Classical Studies 35, 1988, 168–173.

=== Writings on psychotherapy, disability, and community issues ===
==== Books and booklets ====
- A Darker Side of Dorset: Haunting Stories, Avenue Words and Turnpike, 2014, co-edited with Anne Denham.
- The Dreams of Women: Exploring and Interpreting Women's Dreams, The Women’s Press, 1995; W. W. Norton & Co., 1996.
- Moving Heaven and Earth: Sexuality, Spirituality and Social Change, The Women’s Press, 1990; (abridged) Pandora, 1992.
- Understanding Mental Handicap, MIND Publications pamphlet, 1991, with Jane Armitage.
- Public & Private Parts: Songs and Tales of the War Years 1941–81 by Keith Horn, Community Press, 1981, co-edited with Deborah Daly.
- In Our Own Hands: A Book of Self-Help Therapy, The Women's Press, 1981, with Sheila Ernst.

Divide and Rule — Never!, anti-racist booklet for schools, The Newsreel Collective, 1979.

==== Articles and chapters ====
- "Narcissism: Fragile Bodies in a Fragile World", in Psychotherapy and Politics International 7(2), 2009, 81–94, with Sue Cowan-Jensson.
- "Celebrity and the Flight from Mortality", in Free Associations: Psychoanalysis Groups Politics Culture 11(4), No. 60, 2004, 465–476, with Sue Cowan-Jenssen.
- "A Dance to the Music of Time" on dance therapy work in HMP Holloway, in Health Service Journal, October 1999, with Helen Schafer-Cohen.
- "While you were sleeping", in New Woman (Australia), 1997.
- "Portrayal or Betrayal?" on public images of people with special needs or in mental distress, in OPENMIND, journal of MIND, June/July 1992, with Jane Armitage.
- "Snapshots of a Revolution", obituary of photographer Osvaldo Salas, in The Guardian, May 1992.
- "The Story of the Jar", in Sacred Space, edited by Marsha Rowe, Serpent’s Tail 1992, 173–191.
- "Home and Away" on parents from ethnic minority groups who have children with special needs, in Social Work Today, November 1991, with Jane Armitage.
- "The Common Touch", on the healing effects of massage, in OPENMIND, journal of MIND, August/September 1990.
- "Friends and Neighbours" on befriending schemes for people in mental distress, in OPENMIND journal of MIND, April/May 1990.
- "Integration — Whose Ideal?" on special education, in New Society, July 1987.
- "Special Effects" on special education, in The Guardian, January 1987.
- "Only They Know How it Feels: Self-help therapy for parents of handicapped children", in MINDOUT, journal of MIND, September 1981.
- "Self-help Therapy: What does it offer you?" in MINDOUT, journal of MIND, March 1981.
- "With a Little Help from your Friends", on self-help therapy, in The Observer, February 1981, with Sheila Ernst.

== Selected documentary films ==
- Speaking with Sinclair, interview with archaeologist Sinclair Hood, 2020, with Carlos Guarita.
- Breaking Point, Kestrel Films (for Mental Health Film Council), 1975, assistant director.
- Growing Together, Kestrel Films (for the Association for Spina Bifida and Hydrocephalus), 1974, assistant director.
- The Fastest Con in the West, the mythologizing and reality of the Wild West, BBC-2, 1971, writer/director.
- Marx Was Here, BBC-2, 1970, writer/director.
- The Alexandrians, BBC-2, 1970, writer/director.
- This is the Wonderful Year, the story of Sabbati Zevi, BBC-2, 1968, writer/director.
