= Charles Henry Schwarz =

German-American businessman (1825–1903)

- Born: November 17, 1825
- Died: October 11, 1903 (aged 77)
- Spouse: Sophia Franke
- Children: 5
- Relatives: Frederick August Otto Schwarz

Charles Henry Schwarz (November 17, 1825 – October 11, 1903) founded the first Schwarz family toy store in Baltimore, MD called the Schwarz Toy Bazaar. Later, the Toy Bazaar, along with the other brothers' stores, assimilated into FAO Schwarz. Charles was born in Herford, Province of Westphalia, Kingdom of Prussia and was the first of the Schwarz brothers to immigrate to Baltimore, MD in 1840. Charles Henry Schwarz died of pneumonia at his house on October 11, 1903.
