= A Girl's Story =

A Girl's Story may refer to:

- A Girl's Story (film), a 2026 French drama film written and directed by Judith Godrèche
- "A Girl's Story" (short story), a 1977 story in Toni Cade Bambara's collection, The Seabirds are Still Alive
