= Frederick A.O. Schwarz Jr. =

American lawyer (born 1935)

Frederick A. O. Schwarz Jr.
- Born: Frederick August Otto Schwarz Jr. April 20, 1935 (age 91); New York City, US
- Education: Harvard University
- Occupation: Lawyer
- Employer(s): Cravath, Swaine & Moore LLP; Brennan Center for Justice
- Spouse: Marian
- Children: 3

Frederick August Otto "Fritz" Schwarz Jr. (born April 20, 1935) is an American lawyer born in New York City.

== Family and early life ==
Schwarz was born in New York City, the great-grandson of German-American Frederick August Otto Schwarz, the founder of the Fifth Avenue toy store, F.A.O. Schwarz. His family sold the majority interest in the toy store in 1963.

He graduated from Harvard University in 1957 and received a law degree from Harvard Law School in 1960. In 1960, he organized picketing at a Woolworth store in sympathy with black demonstrators in Greensboro, N.C.

He married Marian in 1959. She has served as New York City's Coordinator of Youth Services. They have three children, Eric, a reporter for The Patriot Ledger in Quincy, Massachusetts, and founder of Citizen Schools; Adair and Eliza.

== Career ==
In 1960, he worked as a law clerk for Chief Judge J. Edward Lumbard, Second Circuit United States Court of Appeals. In 1961, he went to Nigeria helping organize the laws of the newly independent country. His experiences were the basis of his 1966 book, Nigeria: The Tribes, The Nation or the Race.

In 1963, he joined Cravath, Swaine & Moore LLP becoming a partner in 1969. In 1975-76, he was chief counsel to the United States Senate Committee on Intelligence, known as the Church Committee. This work among other things, uncovered Central Intelligence Agency plots against foreign leaders and other illegal activities of American intelligence agencies at home and abroad.

The Senate committee work led to a post as an unpaid consultant to Vice President Walter Mondale. In 1977 he was named by President Jimmy Carter to a committee that helped select William H. Webster as the new Director of the Federal Bureau of Investigation.

Schwarz became head of the New York City Law Department in 1982. "At the time, his law firm, which takes on considerable public-interest litigation, was suing the Federal Census Bureau on the city's behalf, challenging a loss of aid based on undercounted minorities."

In his City Hall tenure, he defended victims of bias against homosexuals and minority hiring programs, advocated inclusion of AIDS victims in city classrooms, pressed the Reagan Administration to account for illegal cuts in disability benefits for New Yorkers and, amid scandals, helped reshape ethics and lobbying laws. He served as Corporation Counsel for four years, on leave from his law firm.

Schwarz retired from Cravath at the end of 2001, and was named Senior Counsel in 2002. He is also currently Chief Counsel at the Brennan Center for Justice at the New York University School of Law. On April 30, 2014, he was awarded the prestigious Ridenhour Courage Prize by The Nation Institute, which cited his lifelong pursuit of just and accountable government, including "his call for a full, wide, and no-holds-barred investigation of the abuses by the NSA and other intelligence agencies."
