= Remo Saraceni =

Italian-American toy inventor (1935–2024)

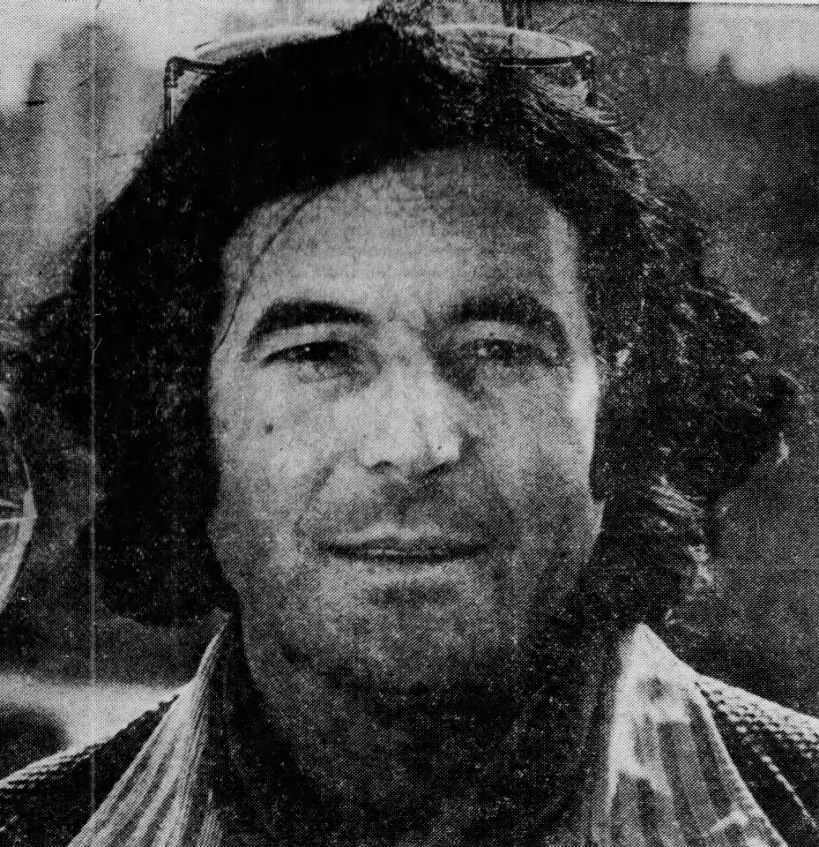
- Saraceni in 1971
- Born: Remo J. Saraceni; 15 January 1935; Fossacesia, Italy
- Died: 3 June 2024 (aged 89); Swarthmore, Pennsylvania, U.S.
- Education: Technical Institute of Milan
- Occupation: Toy inventor
- Spouse(s): Maria Francione (m. 1965; div. 1976) (m. 1995, died.)

Remo J. Saraceni (15 January 1935 – 3 June 2024) was an Italian-American toy inventor. He was known for his invention of the Walking Piano, which was used in the 1988 film Big, starring Tom Hanks.

== Life and career ==
Saraceni was born in Fossacesia, the son of Giuseppe Saraceni, a shoemaker, and Filomena Carulli, a homemaker. He attended the Technical Institute of Milan, earning his master's degree in electronics in 1958. He emigrated to the United States in 1964. He was an artist, lighting designer, sculptor, and an electronic engineer.

In the early 1980s, Saraceni invented the Walking Piano, an oversized synthesizer. His invention was used in the 1988 film Big, where actors Tom Hanks and Robert Loggia danced on the piano in a scene of the film.

== Death ==
Saraceni died on 3 June 2024, of heart failure in Swarthmore, Pennsylvania, at the age of 89.
