= Toy store =

Type of shop

A toy store or toy shop is a type of retail business specializing in selling toys; usually ones marketed towards children.

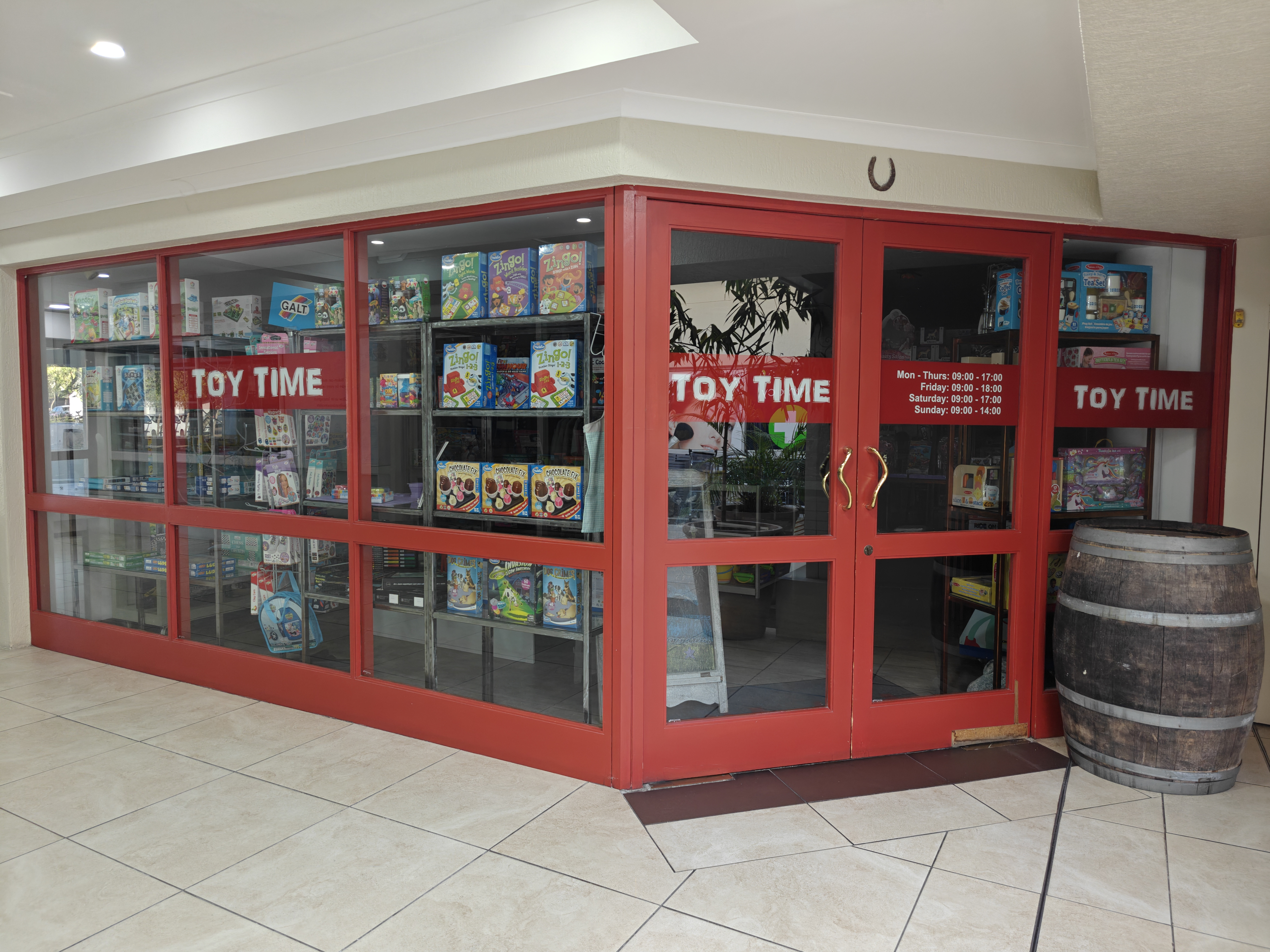
A toy store in Constantia, Cape Town, South Africa

== History ==
The first toy store was founded in 1760 by William Hamley in London, under the name of "Noah's Ark", later renamed to Hamleys. Set over seven floors, a Hamleys branch at 200 Regent Street in the West End of London opened in 1881. The famous toy store in New York City, FAO Schwarz, was founded under the name Schwarz Toy Bazaar. It was founded in 1862 by the German immigrant, Frederick August Otto Schwarz. The former largest toy retailer in the United States, Toys "R" Us, started business in 1948 by Charles Lazarus, a veteran of World War II. In 2015, FAO Schwarz closed, and did not reopen until after Toys "R" Us went bankrupt in 2018.

== Notable examples ==
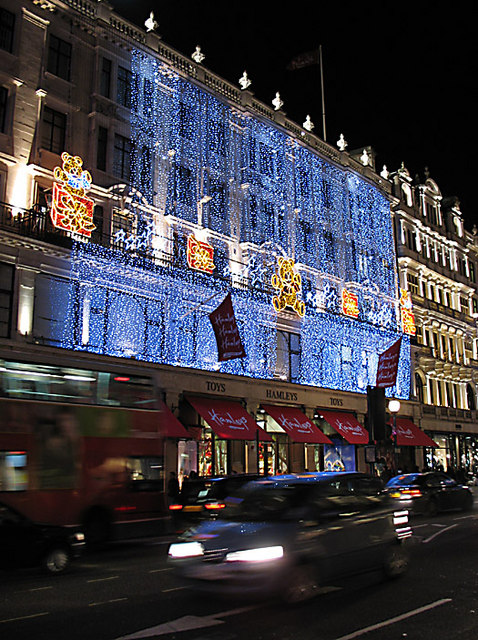
Founded in 1760, Hamleys' flagship store has been based on Regent Street, London since 1881

- Hamleys, listed in the Guinness Book of Records as the world's oldest toy shop
- Toys "R" Us, international company now Tru Kids
- FAO Schwarz, famous American brand and store
- The LEGO Store, official store for Lego toys
- Build-A-Bear Workshop, company specializing in make-your-own stuffed animals
- Learning Express Toys, franchise of specialty toys
- Smyths Toys Superstores, Irish toy store
- Ri Happy, Brazilian toy store
- The Model Shop – Malta's largest toy retailer, founded in 1983 and operating nine outlets across Malta and Gozo.

== Economics ==
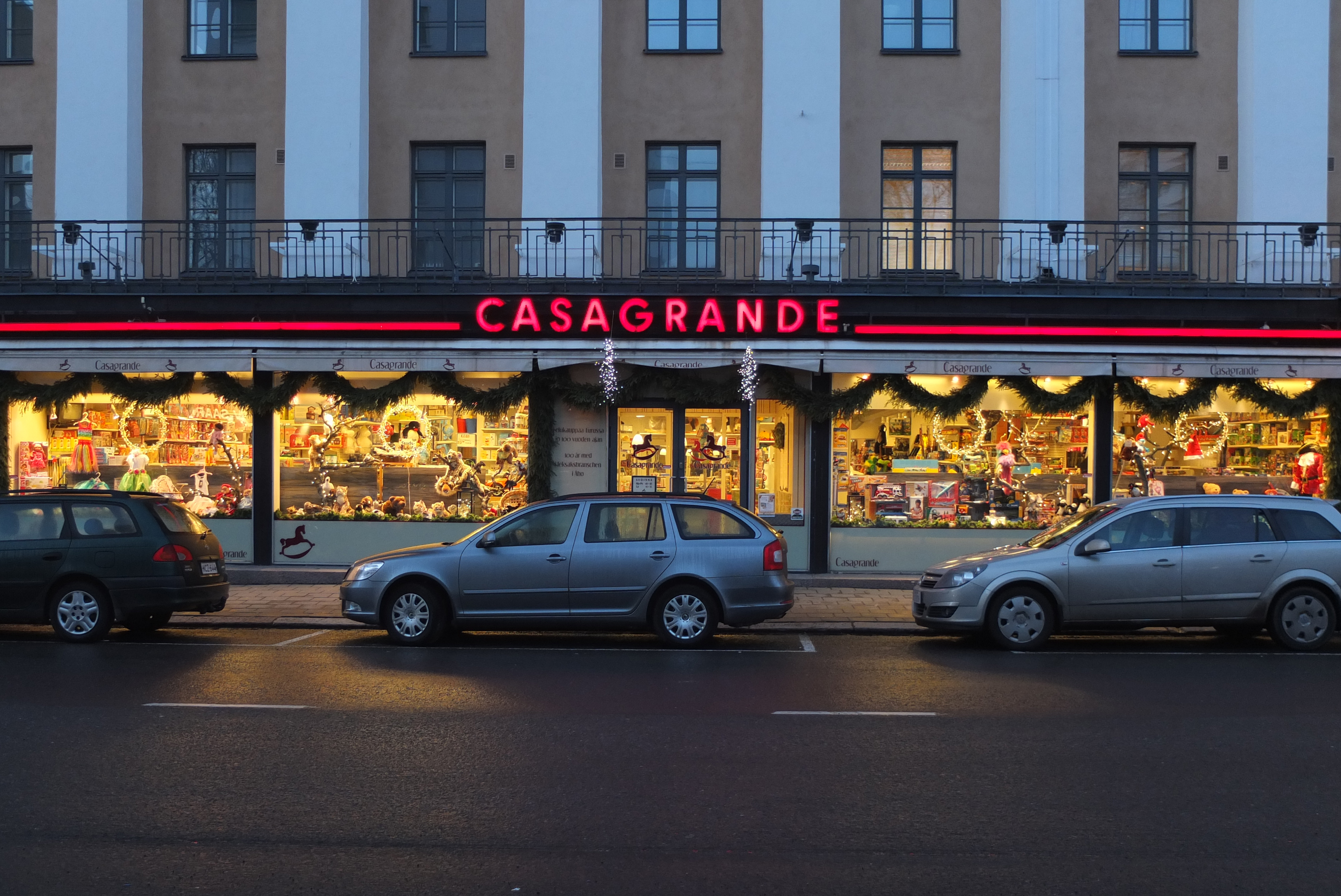
The Casagrande toy store started its operations in 1912 in Turku, Finland. The store pictured in 2014.

Today, toy stores face competition from the online toy market. As a result, many large toy retailers have been rendered bankrupt. These competing websites include Amazon or eBay. Toys "R" Us cut prices in an attempt to compete, but it ultimately ended in failure. As Jeff P. Bezos explained, "For a toy store to survive, they've got to create the kind of fun that Amazon can't." Toy Stores that adopt this model by increasing in-store interactivity have been more successful in maintaining business. Another model many stores have adopted is an online alternative, specifically for the individual retailer.

== Gender-based marketing ==
There can be a large gender bias for the marketing of certain products. This includes using color to market products to a certain gender, or only showing one gender to market to that specific demographic. On the U.S. Disney Store website, the toys for boys are predominantly red, black, brown, or grey, while the toys for girls are mostly pink or purple. However, the toys meant for both boys and girls were mostly of the same color palette as the toys for boys.

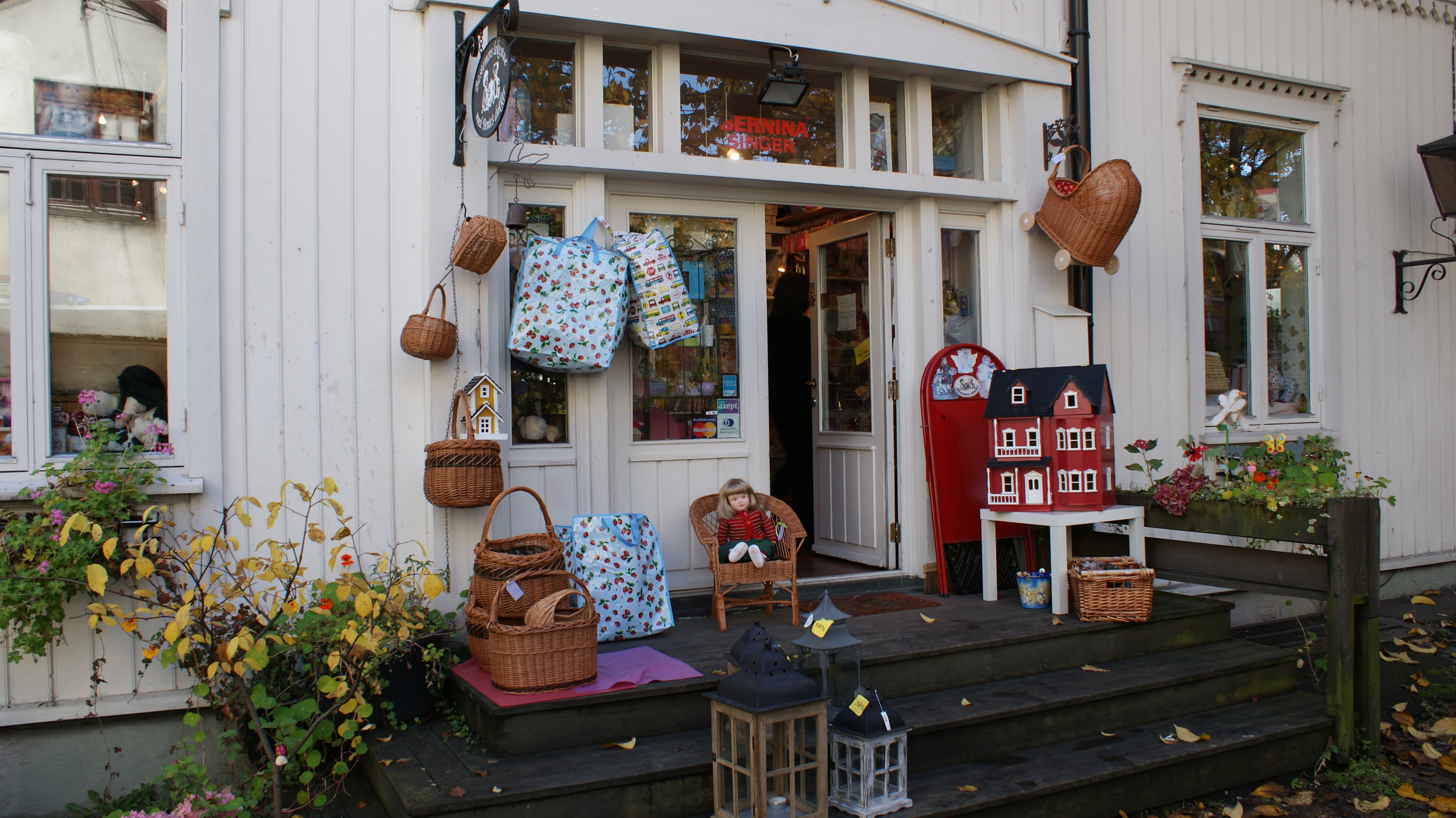
A shop specializing in homemade toys in Oslo, Norway
