= USA Today Best-Selling Books =

List of best-selling books

First appearance of the USA Today Best-Selling Books list, October 29, 1993.

USA Today Best-Selling Books is a list of best-selling books in the United States, published weekly by the newspaper USA Today since 1993. The list includes sales from chain and independent bookstores as well as online retailers, combining this data into a single ranking of the past week's 150 top-selling books.

== History ==
The USA Today Best-Selling Books list was established on October 28, 1993. The paper has referred to the list as "the longest-running USA TODAY data journalism project." The first week's list included data from roughly 3,000 bookstores, including Waldenbooks, Barnes & Noble, Crown Books, Borders Books & Music, Books-A-Million, Lauriat's, and a number of independent bookstores. The first book to top the list was the memoir Private Parts by Howard Stern.

The list began including sales figures from Amazon's Kindle Store in July 2009, followed by sales from Barnes & Noble Nook and Sony Reader devices in February 2010. As of 2010, the list included retail data from over 7,000 physical outlets, as well as online sales.

In 2022, USA Today owner Gannett announced layoffs of 3 percent of its workforce. Among those laid off was Mary Cadden, who had spent 17 years as the list's editor. Following Cadden's departure, USA Today announced in December 2022 that the list would go on hiatus. The list returned in June 2023 under editor Barbara VanDenburgh, arts & entertainment critic for The Arizona Republic, while switching from a manual compilation process to an automated one. The list's relaunch also involved additional partnerships with independent bookstores.

== Methodology ==
As of 2026, the USA Today Best-Selling Books list is published weekly every Wednesday online, and every Thursday in print in the newspaper's Life section. The online list contains the 150 highest-selling book titles in the United States, using sales from the previous Monday through Sunday, while the print list is truncated to the top 50 titles.

Unlike other bestseller lists such as The New York Times Best Seller list, the USA Today list does not separate book sales by format (e.g., hardcover, paperback, audiobook, or ebook) or by genre (e.g., fiction or non-fiction). According to USA Today, the list compiles data from "bookstore chains, independent bookstores, mass merchandisers and online retailers," combining both print and electronic sales.

== Analysis and reception ==
In a 2004 analysis of bestseller lists, Marina Krakovsky wrote for The Washington Post that the USA Today list "reflects a more populist vision" by ranking all books together in a single list. Hillel Italie of the Associated Press said in 2022 that the USA Today list "has been highly valued by authors, agents and publishers".

To celebrate the list's 20th anniversary in 2013, USA Today released an analysis of previous book sales data, splitting the past two decades into three eras: physical bookstores (1993–1998); the growth of Amazon and other online booksellers (1999–2008); and the rapid adoption of ebooks (2009–2013). The analysis noted that self-help books, once dominant on the list, had declined in popularity since the 1990s, while fiction—in particular, children's books like Harry Potter and romance novels such as Fifty Shades of Grey—was on the upswing.
