= Raymond's Run =

1972 short story by Toni Cade Bambara

"Raymond's Run" is a short story by the American author Toni Cade Bambara, published as part of her collection Gorilla, My Love in 1972. The story concerns a young African-American girl's experiences as a talented distance runner and her relationship with her disabled brother.

== Background ==
"Raymond's Run" is one of several stories in Bambara's collection Gorilla, My Love that are narrated by a young black girl named Hazel. Raymond is one of a small number of male characters in Gorilla, My Love.

== Plot summary ==
Hazel Elizabeth Deborah Parker, known as "Squeaky", is a young African-American girl from a poor background. A long-distance runner and caregiver to her disabled brother Raymond, she rejects feminine gender roles, seeing social expectations of women as a pretense concealing women's true selves, and is protective of her brother and willing to fight those who mock him. Hazel particularly abhors another girl, Gretchen; eventually, though, after the girls race against each other, they acknowledge each other as worthwhile opponents. As well as recognising her own need to be true to herself, she comes to recognize Raymond's worth and potential as an individual, rather than simply as someone she must protect, after he shows himself able to keep pace with her when she runs.

== Themes ==
Themes explored in the story include disability, gender and poverty. In her entry on the story in the Encyclopedia of the Black Arts Movement, Meredith Heath Boulden identified the story's central theme as "the question of what it means to be true to your sense of self".

== Critical reception ==
Susan Willis compares Hazel in "Raymond's Run" to the protagonists of Toni Morrison's novels The Bluest Eye and Sula, which she argues similarly use the child's perspective to "expos[e] the contradictions of capitalist society". Willis identifies the race official who calls Hazel by her nickname "Squeaky", and suggests she let another runner win, as a central figure, and argues his presence "articulates the manipulative control figures of authority seek to exercise in any given situation." Willis argues the story is characterised by a "sense of politics as opposition and contestation" inherited from the 1960s counterculture, but simultaneously suggests another form of politics, and other, less oppositional relationships, in particular through Hazel's relationships with Gretchen and Raymond.

Elliott Butler-Evans reads Hazel's willingness to defend Raymond as evidence of the character's "toughness and independence" and her "rejection of 'approved' feminine roles", and finds this rejection to be further exemplified by her commentary on ways girls and women are encouraged to compete with another. Butler-Evans argues that "Raymond's Run" "marks the emergence of a consciousness grounded in feminine and proto-feminist experiences" through its "questioning and challenging of gender roles, the insertion of the problem of female bonding in the text, and, most significantly, the construction of a rebellious antisocial girl protagonist", all of which "produce counterdiscourses that challenge the dominant hierarchical discourse of Black cultural nationalism."

Elizabeth Muther reads the story in connection to Bambara's non-fiction book The Black Woman (1970), which was published less than a year prior to "Raymond's Run"'s first publication, and the response to the Moynihan Report of 1965. Muther argues that Bambara's use of child narrators in "Raymond's Run" and "Gorilla, My Love" allows her to "answer back, through the prescience and self-assurance of children, to the fraudulent postulates of an anxiety-stricken white supremacist culture." In Muther's reading, the story's "transformational power" resides in Hazel's realization of her connection to Gretchen and Raymond and of their worth. Muther suggests that Hazel recalls the Moynihan Report's account of the African-American matriarch by virtue of her independence and resilience, while problematizing such a reading through her relationship with Raymond; and that she and her family thus offer a critique of the report's "liberal condescension."

== Reception ==
"Raymond's Run" is among Bambara's most frequently anthologized works.
