= Zany Brainy =

American children's toy retailer

- Company type: Subsidiary
- Industry: Retail
- Founded: 1991
- Founder: David Schlessinger
- Defunct: November 2003
- Fate: Bankruptcy, dissolved by parent company
- Successor: Five Below
- Headquarters: Pasadena, California, United States
- Products: Toys
- Parent: FAO Schwarz
- Website: www.zanybrainy.com

Zany Brainy was an American retail store chain subsidiary of FAO Schwarz. Its merchandise consisted of educational toys and multi-media products aimed at children ages 4–13, such as games and puzzles, infant development toys, books, audiocassettes, CDs, videos, arts and crafts, building toys and trains, computer software, electronic learning aids and musical instruments, science toys, plush toys and dolls, and sports-themed toys. The stores offered daily events such as workshops, concerts, and author appearances.

David Schlessinger, who had earlier started the now-defunct Encore Books chain of bookstores, founded Zany Brainy in 1991. The company filed for Chapter 11 bankruptcy protection on May 15, 2001, having faced financial difficulties since acquiring rival company Noodle Kidoodle in 2000. At the time its assets were sold to Right Start later that year, Zany Brainy had 187 retail locations nationwide. It announced the shuttering of its remaining stores in December 2003.

David Schlessinger and former Zany Brainy CEO Thomas Vellios would later open a chain of discount stores named Five Below in October 2002.

Zany Brainy was revived as an online store in 2020, with a select line of products.
