= The Salt Eaters =

1980 novel by Toni Cade Bambara

- First edition
- Author: Toni Cade Bambara
- Language: English
- Publisher: Random House
- Publication date: 1980
- ISBN: 978-0-679-74076-6
- OCLC: 4957488

The Salt Eaters is a 1980 novel, the first such work by Toni Cade Bambara. The novel is written in an experimental style and is explicitly political in tone, with several of the characters being veterans of the civil rights, feminist, and anti-war movements of the 1960s and 1970s. It is set in the fictional town of Claybourne, Georgia.

== Plot ==
The novel opens on Minnie Ransom, the "fabled healer of the district", performing a healing on Velma Henry who has attempted suicide by slitting her wrists and sticking her head into a gas oven. Velma, a community activist who has worked in various leftist movements, has suffered a nervous breakdown due to the increasing factionalism in the activist community of Claybourne as well as her failing marriage to Obie, another activist, and the pressures of her job as a computer programmer at Transchemical, a chemical plant in the neighboring town.

Minnie, an unmarried eccentric, calls on her spiritual guide, a "haint" she called Old Wife, to guide her through the healing as she feels Velma is resisting her efforts. (Old Wife was the elderly woman who helped Minnie deal with the emotional breakdown she experienced after she ran away from the bible college that her well-to-do parents sent her to and headed to New York City.) Many chapters of the book feature long internal dialogues between Minnie and Old Wife, with the two of them having spirited debates about the "loas" that Old Wife refuses to acknowledge. The healing, which is conducted in the infirmary that Velma helped to establish to serve the community is witnessed by several visitors, most of whom have some sort of connection to Velma.

The entirety of the novel's action revolves around the healing, with the planning of the upcoming Spring Festival serving as backdrop. The point-of-view of the novel shifts numerous times between characters. "At once spiritual, apocalyptic, mysterious, cacophonic, and destabilizing, The Salt Eaters offers a unifying epiphany of creation and community."

== Bibliography ==
- Bambara, Toni Cade. The Salt Eaters, Random House, 1980.
