= Right Start =

Retailer of children's products

- Company type: Toy catalog
- Founded: 1985
- Defunct: 2009
- Products: Toys

Right Start was a retailer of children's products. They began in 1985 as a catalog company, based out of Los Angeles. The company was founded by Stan Fridstein, Lenny Targon, and Harry Rosenthal who identified a growing market in young, first time parents who were looking for expertise and guidance in choosing high quality baby products. The company opened its first retail store in 1991, in Westlake Village, CA. In 1992, they began expanding, opening up their first location in a Rich's department store in Atlanta, Georgia.

The Right Start was majority owned by bowling center operator American Recreation Centers, Inc., before it was sold to Kayne Anderson, a Los Angeles-based investment firm, in 1995.

In 2000, they withdrew from a proposed initial public offering and began exploring merger possibilities. In 2001, they purchased FAO Schwarz from Royal Vendex KBB and Zany Brainy. They changed their name in 2002 to FAO Inc.

In 2003, they twice filed for bankruptcy and sold the FAO Schwarz stores in Manhattan and Las Vegas, along with their related internet and catalog businesses in December.

In 2009, Right Start was purchased by Liberty Interactive Media and reopened 9 stores nationwide. Right Start was sold to competitor giggle in 2016.
