= Dance Chimes =

Foot-operated chime-like musical instrument

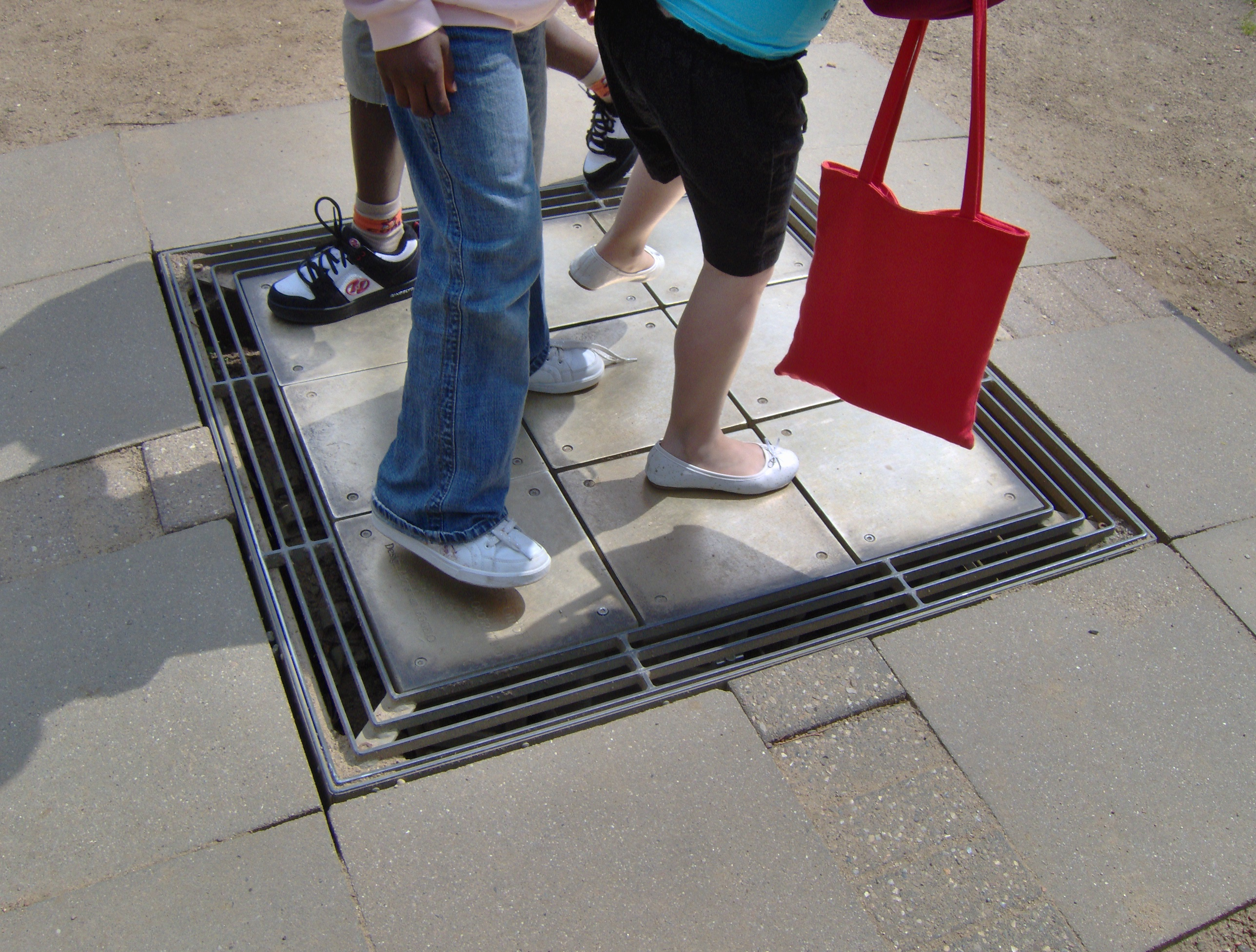
Dance Chimes at the Botanical Gardens in Hamburg, Germany

The Dance Chimes is a foot-operated chime-like musical instrument that consists of nine bronze tiles, with mechanical sound elements under each.

== Description ==
The nine bronze tiles of the Dance Chimes are arranged in a square formation and usually in-built in the ground. The sound pads are triggered by sensitive hammers activated while hopping, jumping or dancing. The tone is bell-like and the notes are tuned in a pentatonic sequence and can be played note by note to play a melody, or sounded together to play a chord.

== History ==
Invented and designed by Alfons van Leggelo in the 1970s, the Dance Chimes was created to relate the movement of walking directly with sound. The instrument, made of bronze is related to the physical properties of the carillon. The name 'Dance Chimes' comes from the movement to 'dance', a connection between movement and sound experience, and 'chimes', the instrument most similar in material and sound.

Dance Chimes have been installed in public places worldwide, including Battery Park, Citygarden, Diana, Princess of Wales Memorial Playground, Museumplein, Amsterdam, and schools for mentally/physically handicapped children.

== Technical details ==
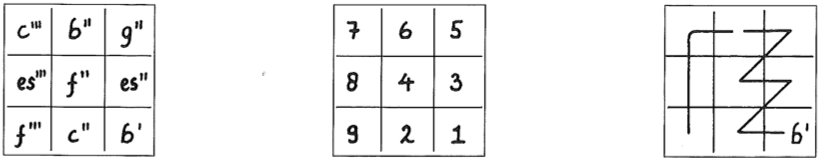
NOTE: b stands for B♭ and es for E♭ in German.

The left panel shows the tuning of the dance chimes. The middle panel shows the corresponding nine tones under the nine tiles numbered 1 through 9. The right panel shows the path from the lowest (b') to the highest (f"').

== See also ==
- Chime (bell instrument)
- Walking Piano – Oversized synthesizer
