= Five Below =

American specialty discount gift shop chain

Five Below, Inc.

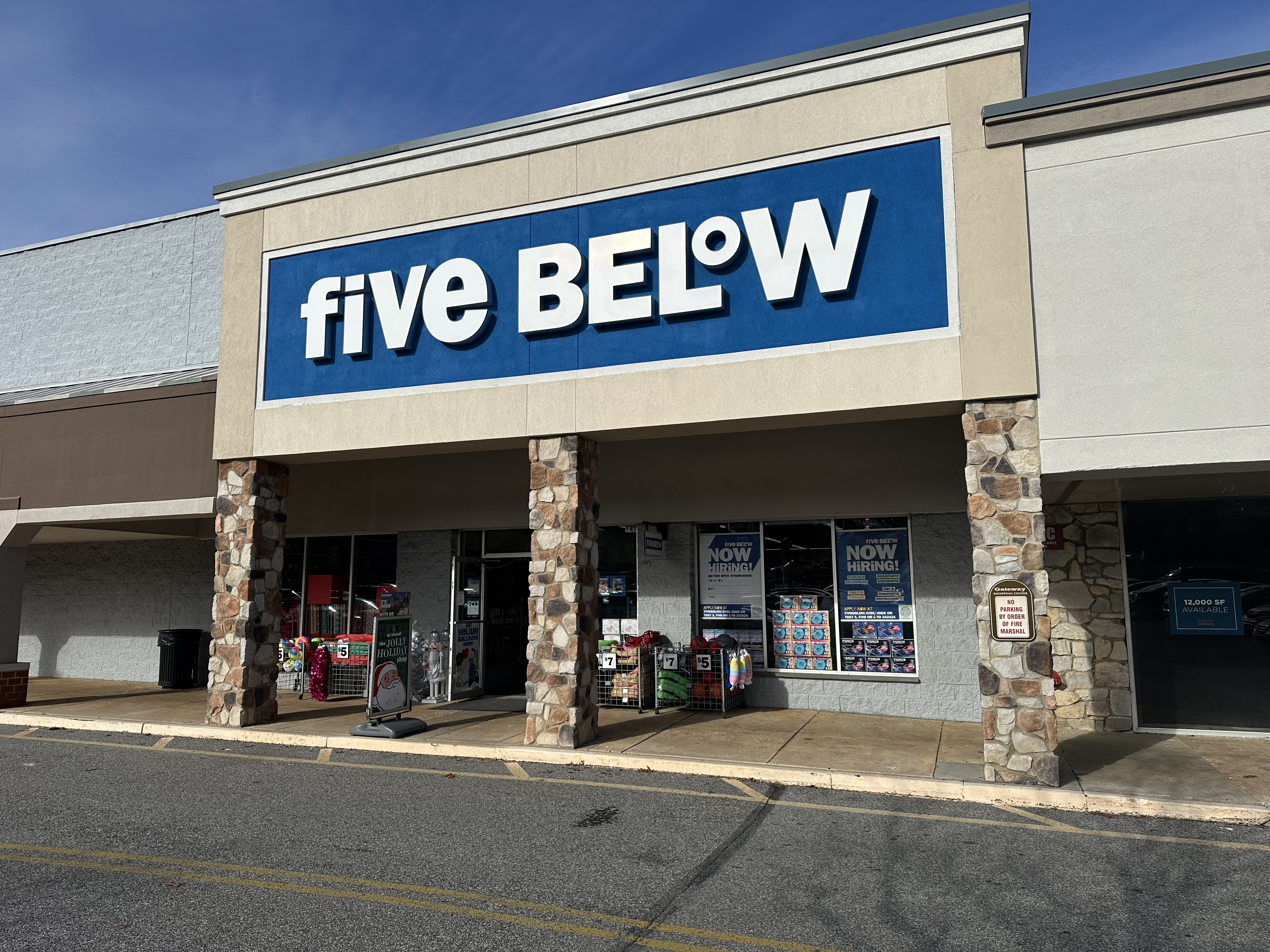
- Exterior of Five Below's first store in Wayne, Pennsylvania.
- Type: Public
- Traded as: Nasdaq: FIVE; S&P 400 component
- Industry: Discount store, Retail
- Founded: October 4, 2002; 24 years ago Wayne, Pennsylvania, U.S.
- Founders: David Schlessinger, Tom Vellios
- Headquarters: Philadelphia, Pennsylvania, United States
- Number of locations: ▲1,970 (2026); ▲1,850 (2025); ▲1,400+ (2023); 353 (2014)
- Area served: United States—48 states
- Key people: Winnie Park (CEO)
- Products: Sports, games, fashion accessories, bath and body, candy and beverages, room décor and storage, stationery and school supplies, books, smartphone accessories, novelty and gag items, seasonal items
- Revenue: ▲US$2.848 billion (Fiscal Year Ended January 29, 2022)
- Operating income: ▲US$379.880 million (Fiscal Year Ended January 29, 2022)
- Net income: ▲US$278.810 million (Fiscal Year Ended January 29, 2022)
- Total assets: ▲US$2.880 billion (Fiscal Year Ended January 29, 2022)
- Total equity: ▲US$1.120 billion (Fiscal Year Ended January 29, 2022)
- Website: fivebelow.com

Five Below, Inc. (stylized as fiVe BEL°W) is an American chain of specialty discount gift shops that prices most of its products at up to $5, plus a smaller assortment of products priced up to $40. Founded in 2002 by Tom Vellios and David Schlessinger and headquartered in Philadelphia, Pennsylvania, the chain is aimed at tweens and teens. By 2014, there were more than 1,850 stores located across the United States.

== History ==
David Schlessinger, founder of Encore Books and Zany Brainy, and Tom Vellios, former CEO of Zany Brainy, founded Five Below on October 4, 2002 in Wayne, Pennsylvania.

On March 18, 2020, Five Below announced the temporary closure of all of its stores due to the COVID-19 outbreak. However, by June 6, 2020, 100% of Five Below stores across the United States reopened with plans for new stores to open up. This may account for an increase in foot traffic in 2022-2023, as reported by Unacast, a company that provides location insights. According to Unacast, Five Below experienced "a remarkable 63% year-over-year increase in foot traffic" between Q2 2022 to Q2 2023.

=== Growth and expansion ===
To date, Five Below operates over 2,000 locations everywhere except Alaska & Hawaii, employing over 40,000 people.. It began its outward expansion away from the Philadelphia Metro area by entering additional out-of-state markets: Illinois and Michigan in 2011; Georgia, Kansas, Missouri, and Western Michigan in 2012; Texas in 2013; Tennessee in 2014; Alabama, Florida, and Kentucky in 2015; Louisiana, Minnesota, Oklahoma, West Virginia, and Wisconsin in 2016; California in 2017; and Arkansas in 2018. Five Below in 2019 publicly stated that they could build as many as 2,500 U.S. stores in the future. Arizona, Iowa, and Nebraska were introduced that year. Colorado and Nevada were added in 2020; New Mexico and Utah in 2021. Both Dakotas had opened new stores in 2022. Vermont joined in the next year. Wyoming was added in 2024. 2025 saw the first stores in Oregon & Washington open. Idaho, in August 2026, saw their first store open in Lewiston, leaving Montana, the remaining continental state, to open their first store a few days after.

In September 2014, the company announced a new lease agreement to move its New Castle, Delaware, distribution center to Oldmans Township, New Jersey. The new center would add 275 jobs to the local economy while Delaware would lose 175.

On July 19, 2012, Five Below went public on the NASDAQ at the share price of $17. In 2014, Joel Anderson was appointed CEO. 2016 sales were $1 billion, 2017 sales were $1.3 billion, and 2022 sales reached $3.08 billion.

In 2018, Five Below moved its corporate headquarters, now called WowTown, to the Lit Brothers Building in the Market East section of Philadelphia, and has rights to more than 200,000 square feet. WowTown has over 300 employees.

On July 16, 2024, Five Below announced Joel Anderson had resigned from his roles as president and CEO to pursue other interests.

Following his departure, Five Below's shares fell by 25%. On the same day Petco named him as their new CEO.

In July 2024, Chief Operating Officer, Kenneth Bull, was appointed interim president and CEO of Five Below before being replaced by former Forever 21 CEO, Winnie Park, in December 2024. Park is a Princeton University graduate with an MBA from Northwestern University. Prior to joining Five Below, she had been the CEO of Forever 21 since January 2022. She also served as the CEO of Paper Source.

== Store format ==
The average Five Below store size is 8,000 square feet (740 m^{2}). The store carries a wide variety of merchandise at varying low costs.

== Philanthropy ==
In 2006, Five Below partnered with Alex's Lemonade Stand Foundation to sell lemonade bracelets, gift cards and pin-ups to raise money for childhood cancer cure research. Since the initial partnership, Five Below raised $12.8 million for the organization.

In 2008, Five Below partnered with St. Jude Children's Research Hospital in the hospital's annual Halloween Promotion. The companies have since partnered to raise more than $13.7 million for St. Jude through fundraising campaigns.

After Hurricane Sandy in October 2012, Five Below partnered with the American Red Cross and collected over $50,000 through a $1 donation at the register program. The company then doubled all donations resulting in a donation in the total of $100,000.

In 2018, Five Below became an official Toys for Tots sponsor.
