= Toni Cade Bambara =

American author, activist, professor (1939–1995)

- Born: Miltona Mirkin Cade; March 25, 1939; Harlem, New York City, U.S.
- Died: December 9, 1995 (aged 56); Philadelphia, Pennsylvania, U.S.
- Occupations: Writer; documentary-film maker; political activist; educator
- Children: 1
- Writing career
- Notable works: "Blues Ain't No Mockin Bird"; The Salt Eaters; The Black Woman: An Anthology

Toni Cade Bambara, born Miltona Mirkin Cade (March 25, 1939 – December 9, 1995), was an African-American author, documentary film-maker, social activist and college professor.

== Early life and education ==
Miltona Mirkin Cade was born in Harlem, New York, to parents Walter Cade and Helen Brent Henderson Cade. She lived with her mother and brother, Walter, growing up in the New York metropolitan area. They lived in Harlem, Bedford Stuyvesant (Brooklyn), Queens, and Jersey City. At the age of six, she changed her name from Miltona to Toni.

Bambara's mother had lived in Harlem during the Harlem Renaissance, and she encouraged her children to daydream, read, and write. As a child, Bambara spent a lot of time in the New York Public Library, and was inspired by poems from Gwendolyn Brooks and Langston Hughes there. She began writing stories as a child and cited her mother's support of her writing as a large influence on her career.

In 1970, Bambara changed her name to include the name of a West African ethnic group, Bambara, after finding the name written as part of a signature on a sketchbook discovered in a trunk among her great-grandmother's other belongings. She felt her new name represented "the accumulation of experiences", in which she had finally discovered her purpose in the world. In 1970, Bambara had a daughter, Karma Bene Bambara Smith, with her partner Gene Lewis, an actor and a family friend.

Bambara attended Queens College in 1954, where almost the entire undergraduate student population was white. At first, she planned to become a doctor, but her passion for arts directed her to become an English major. As Bambara had a passion for jazz and different forms of art in general, she became a member of the Dance Club of Queens College. She also took part in theater, where she was designated as stage manager and costume designer. Bambara was among those who participated in folk singing when it first emerged in the 1950s, when the songs had a political message inscribed in them. In January 1959, she published her first short story, "Sweet Town", in Vendome. She graduated from Queens College with a B.A. degree in Theater Arts/English Literature in 1959. Upon graduation, the college bestowed her with the John Golden Award for Fiction.

After college, Bambara enrolled in the City College of the City University of New York's graduate program to study modern American fiction. Her second short story, "Mississippi Ham Rider", was published in the summer 1960 issue of The Massachusetts Review. In 1961, she traveled to Europe to study theatrical arts. Bambara first studied Commedia dell'Arte at the University of Florence. She then studied mime at the Ecole de Mime Etienne Decroux in Paris, France. She also became interested in dance before completing her master's degree at City College in 1964.

== Academic career ==
Bambara worked in social services to support herself through graduate school. From 1959 to 1961, she was a social investigator at the Harlem Welfare Center, working for the New York State Department of Welfare. After returning from her European studies, she was a recreation director in the psychiatric ward of Metropolitan Hospital, 1961-1962. From 1962 to 1965, she was program director of Colony House Settlement House in Brooklyn.

From 1965 to 1969, she worked with City College's "Search for Education, Elevation, Knowledge" (SEEK) program and helped with its development. She taught English, published material and directed and advised SEEK's black theatre group, the Theater of the Black Experience. She also served as the faculty advisor for student publications including Obsidian, Onyx, and The Paper.

Bambara became an English instructor for the New Careers Program of Newark, New Jersey, in 1969. She was made assistant professor of English at Rutgers University's new Livingston College that same year. She co-advised the Harambee Dancers, the Malcolm Players, and the Sisters in Consciousness. She became an associate professor at Livingston and left the school in 1974.

She was visiting professor in Afro-American Studies at Emory University and at Atlanta University (1977), where she also taught at the School of Social Work (until 1979). Bambara was production-artist-in-residence at Neighborhood Arts Center (1975–79), at Stephens College in Columbia, Missouri (1976), and at Atlanta's Spelman College (1978–79). From 1986, she taught film-script writing at Louis Massiah's Scribe Video Center in Philadelphia. Bambara also held lectures at the Library of Congress and the Smithsonian Institution, where she conducted literary readings.

== Activism ==
Bambara worked within black communities to create consciousness around ideas such as feminism and black awareness. As Bambara had become part of the faculty of City College, she strived to make it more inclusive. To do this, she wanted to add more classes, such as a nutrition course, to teach students more about their culture. Bambara also wanted to see a creation of an academy that generated an environment in which students could become more involved in learning more about political and social problems in the community as well as their culture.

Bambara participated in several community and activist organizations, and her work was influenced by the Civil Rights and Black Nationalist movements of the 1960s. In the early to mid-1970s, she traveled to Cuba along with Robert Cole, Hattie Gossett, Barbara Webb, and Suzanne Ross to study how women's political organizations operated there. She put these experiences into practice in the late 1970s after moving with her daughter Karma Bene to Atlanta, Georgia, where Bambara co-founded the Southern Collective of African American Writers.

Bambara wrote frequently about activism. In her novel The Salt Eaters, she considers the role of activism within the black community. Additionally, her essay "On the Issue of Roles" considers the tensions present in black activist spaces. Bambara claims that often, within radical political spaces, there is a reproduction of the binary division between what is considered to be a man and woman's role in revolution. Bambara claims within the essay that, the "either/or implicit in those definitions are antithetical to what [she] is all about, and what revolution for the self is all about". In the essay, she calls for black radical thinkers to abandon the stringent markers of manhood and feminity, and instead invest in Blackhood, that is "an androgynous self, via commitment to the struggle". For Bambara, radical political thought requires unity and alignment via a connected movement for liberation.

== Literary career ==
Bambara was active in the 1960s Black Arts Movement and the emergence of black feminism. In her writings, she was inspired by New York's streets and its culture, where the culture influenced her due to her experience of the teachings of "Garveyites, Muslims, Pan-Africanists and Communists against the backdrop and the culture of jazz music". Her anthology The Black Woman (1970), including poetry, short stories, and essays by Nikki Giovanni, Audre Lorde, Alice Walker, Paule Marshall and herself, as well as work by Bambara's students from the SEEK program, was the first feminist collection to focus on African-American women. Tales and Stories for Black Folk (1971) contained work by Langston Hughes, Ernest J. Gaines, Pearl Crayton, Alice Walker and students. She wrote the introduction for another groundbreaking feminist anthology by women of color, This Bridge Called My Back (1981), edited by Gloria Anzaldúa and Cherríe Moraga. While Bambara is often described as a "feminist", in her chapter entitled "On the Issue of Roles", she writes: "Perhaps we need to let go of all notions of manhood and femininity and concentrate on Blackhood."

Bambara's 1972 book, Gorilla, My Love, collected 15 of her short stories, written between 1960 and 1970. Most of these stories are told from a first-person point of view and are "written in rhythmic urban black English". The narrator is often a sassy young girl who is tough, brave, and caring and who "challenge[s] the role of the female black victim". Bambara called her writing "upbeat" fiction. Among the stories included were "Blues Ain't No Mockin Bird" as well as "Raymond's Run" and "The Lesson". This collection of short stories mirrored the behavior of Bambara, in which was described as "dramatic, often flamboyant, with a penchant for authentic emotion".

Her novel The Salt Eaters (1980) centers on a healing event that coincides with a community festival in a fictional city of Claybourne, Georgia. In the novel, minor characters use a blend of modern medical techniques alongside traditional folk medicines and remedies to help the central character, Velma, heal after a suicide attempt. Through the struggle of Velma and the other characters surrounding her, Bambara chronicles the deep psychological toll that African-American political and community organizers can suffer, especially women. Bambara continues to investigate ideas of illness and wellness in the black community with a call to action through her characters. "Velma (and by extension black women) must re-affirm healthy relationships with one another that create and sustain pathways towards wholeness and reprioritize black women's health in the larger domain of social justice movements." While The Salt Eaters was her first novel, she won the American Book Award. In 1981, she also won the Langston Hughes Society Award.

After the publication and success of The Salt Eaters, she focused on film and television production throughout the 1980s. From 1980 to 1988, she produced at least one film per year. Bambara wrote the script for Louis Massiah's 1986 film The Bombing of Osage Avenue, which dealt with the massive police assault on the Philadelphia headquarters of the black liberation group MOVE on May 13, 1985. The film was a success, viewed at film festivals and airing on national public broadcasting channels.

Bambara's novel Those Bones Are Not My Child (whose manuscript she titled "If Blessings Come") was published posthumously in 1999. It deals with the disappearance and murder of 40 black children in Atlanta between 1979 and 1981. It was called her masterpiece by Toni Morrison, who edited it and also gathered some of Bambara's short stories, essays, and interviews in the volume Deep Sightings & Rescue Missions: Fiction, Essays & Conversations (Vintage, 1996).

Bambara's work was explicitly political, concerned with injustice and oppression in general and with the fate of African-American communities and grassroots political organizations in particular.

Female protagonists and narrators dominate her writing, which was informed by radical feminism and firmly placed inside African-American culture, with its dialect, oral traditions and jazz techniques. Like other members of the Black Arts Movement, Bambara was heavily influenced by "Garveyites, Muslims, Pan-Africanists, and Communists" in addition to modern jazz artists such as Sun Ra and John Coltrane, whose music served not only as inspiration but provided a structural and aesthetic model for written forms as well. This is evident in her work through her development of non-linear "situations that build like improvisations to a melody" to focus on character and building a sense of place and atmosphere. Bambara also credited her strong-willed mother, Helen Bent Henderson Cade Brehon, who urged her and her brother Walter Cade (an established painter) to be proud of African-American culture and history.

Bambara contributed to PBS's American Experience documentary series with Midnight Ramble: Oscar Micheaux and the Story of Race Movies. She also was one of four filmmakers who made the collaborative 1995 documentary W. E. B. Du Bois: A Biography in Four Voices.

== Bibliography ==
=== Fiction ===
- Gorilla, My Love (short stories). New York: Random House, 1972.
  - "Blues Ain't No Mockin Bird"
  - "The Lesson"
- The Sea Birds Are Still Alive: Collected Stories (short stories). New York: Random House, 1977.
  - "A Girl's Story"
- The Salt Eaters (novel). New York: Random House, 1980.
- Those Bones Are Not My Child (novel), New York: Pantheon, 1999.

=== Non-fiction ===
- The American Adolescent Apprentice Novel. City College of New York, 1964. 146 pp.
- Southern Black Utterances Today. Institute of Southern Studies, 1975.
- "What Is It I Think I'm Doing Anyhow". In: J. Sternberg (editor), The Writer on Her Work: Contemporary Women Reflect on Their Art and Their Situation. New York: W.W. Norton, 1980, pp. 153–178.
- Salvation Is the Issue. In: Mari Evans (editor), Black Women Writers (1950–1980): A Critical Evaluation. Garden City, NY: Anchor/Doubleday, 1984, pp. 41–47.
- Foreword, This Bridge Called My Back. Persephone Press, 1981.

=== Collected writings ===
- Toni Morrison (editor): Deep Sightings and Rescue Missions: Fiction, Essays and Conversations. New York: Pantheon, 1996.

=== As editor ===
- as Toni Cade (editor): The Black Woman: An Anthology. New York: New American Library, 1970.
- Toni Cade Bambara (editor): Tales and Stories for Black Folks. Garden City, NY: Doubleday, 1971.

=== Produced screenplays ===
- Zora. WGBH-TV Boston, 1971
- The Johnson Girls. National Educational Television, 1972.
- Transactions, School of Social Work, Atlanta University 1979.
- The Long Night. American Broadcasting Co., 1981.
- Epitaph for Willie. K. Heran Productions, Inc., 1982.
- Tar Baby. Screenplay based on Toni Morrison's novel Tar Baby. Sanger/Brooks Film Productions, 1984.
- Raymond's Run. Public Broadcasting System, 1985.
- The Bombing of Osage Avenue. WHYY-TV Philadelphia, 1986.
- Cecil B. Moore: Master Tactician of Direct Action. WHY-TV Philadelphia, 1987.
- W.E.B. Du Bois: A Biography in Four Voices (1995)

== Death ==
Bambara was diagnosed with colon cancer in 1993 and two years later died in Philadelphia, Pennsylvania.

== Awards and recognition ==
In 1959, the year she graduated from college, Bambara earned the Long Island Star's Pauper Press Award for nonfiction.

Bambara was awarded with the Langston Hughes Medal in 1981.

Bambara was posthumously inducted into the Georgia Writers Hall of Fame in 2013.
