= Blues Ain't No Mockin Bird =

1971 short story by Toni Cade Bambara

- Short story by Toni Cade Bambara
- Country: United States
- Language: English
- Genre: Short story

Publication
- Published in: 1971
- Publisher: Toni Cade Bambara

"Blues Ain't No Mocking Bird" is a short story by Toni Cade Bambara written in 1971. It is told through the point of view of a young black girl in North America. The story is about a family whose privacy is invaded by two white cameramen that are making a film for the county's food stamp program.

== Plot ==
In this story, the little girl is playing at her grandmother's house with her cousin Cathy and her neighbors, Tyrone and Terry. Two white filmmakers, shooting a film ‘‘about food stamps’’ for the county, trespass in the girl's yard. The little girl’s grandmother asks the filmmakers to leave, but they simply move further away. The grandmother shares a story with the children and Cathy which relates to her feeling about people filming without permission. To her, life is not to be publicized to everyone because they are not as "good" or wealthy as others.

The girl's grandfather, Granddaddy Cain, returns from hunting a chicken hawk. He nails the female hawk, alive and flapping, to the wall. When its mate comes after it, Granddaddy Cain kills it with a hammer. Granddaddy then takes the camera from the men and tears out the film. The filmmakers swear and exit the premises. Cathy, the cousin of the little girl, displays a precocious ability to interpret other people’s actions and words as well as an interest in storytelling and writing. At the end of the story, Cathy decides to write a story based on what happened that day. She says she will call it “The Proper Use of the Hammer”. It is unclear if she has fully understood the events.

The reader may notice the nonstandard spellings of words such as 'mockin' ('mocking') or 'nuthin' ('nothing') as the story is written in a variety of African-American English.

== Publication ==
The story was first published in 1971 as part of the author's book Gorilla, My Love, which is a collection of short stories.
