= The Lesson (short story) =

1972 short story by Toni Cade Bambara

"The Lesson" is a short story by Toni Cade Bambara (1938–1995). It was first published in 1972.

== Plot ==
Sylvia is a young, black girl from New York City living in an inner city neighborhood. She is also the narrator as well. Amidst a hot summer day, Miss Moore, a well-educated black woman, rallies up children across the neighborhood to a mailbox. She then starts to talk about the issues of money and wealth inequality in the country, but Sylvia and the other children are not interested.

Miss Moore then takes the children on the trip to a taxi and to a toy store outside of their neighborhood. She also refers to their neighborhood as "poor and the slums." The toy store is FAO Schwarz in Manhattan. The children don't take Miss Moore or the trip seriously until they begin to see the prices of toys out the window of the store with high prices. Miss Moore tries to highlight the disadvantages the children are at comparing it to the supplies they have for school which are lacking or minimal.

Another one of the kids then stares at a sailboat for sale when the kids begin to realize the toys and prices are more meant for rich customers. Miss Moore then encourages Sylvia and one of her friends Sugar to go in and see how much it costs. They both get shy when entering and as everyone walks around the store, they all stare at the games and price tags to a point where Sylvia then questions Miss Moore's reasoning for the trip. Sylvia also questions how people could spend this much for these toys when other things for the same price would be considered more valuable to her and the others.

Miss Moore then takes the children back to the mailbox for everyone to reflect on the day. Sugar then also questions Miss Moore over her reasoning for the trip to which she responds back that she did it to prove disparities between communities of color and more wealthy Americans in budgets. Following the end of Miss Moore's reflection, Sylvia and Sugar look at what money they both have left and take off racing each other to Hascombs.

== Sources ==
- Friedman, Joe. "Review of Toni Cade Bambara's "The Lesson". HubPages.HubPages Inc. 2011. Web. 24 Oct. 2011.
- Short Stories for Students. "The Lesson". Book Rags. Gale Group. 2000-07. Web. 24 Oct. 2011.
- Andrew, Richard. “The Man Who Was Almost a Man.” The Story and Its Writer. Ed. Ann Charters. Compact 8th ed. California: Bedford/St. Martin’s, 2011. 878-87. Print.
