= Walking Piano =

Oversized synthesizer

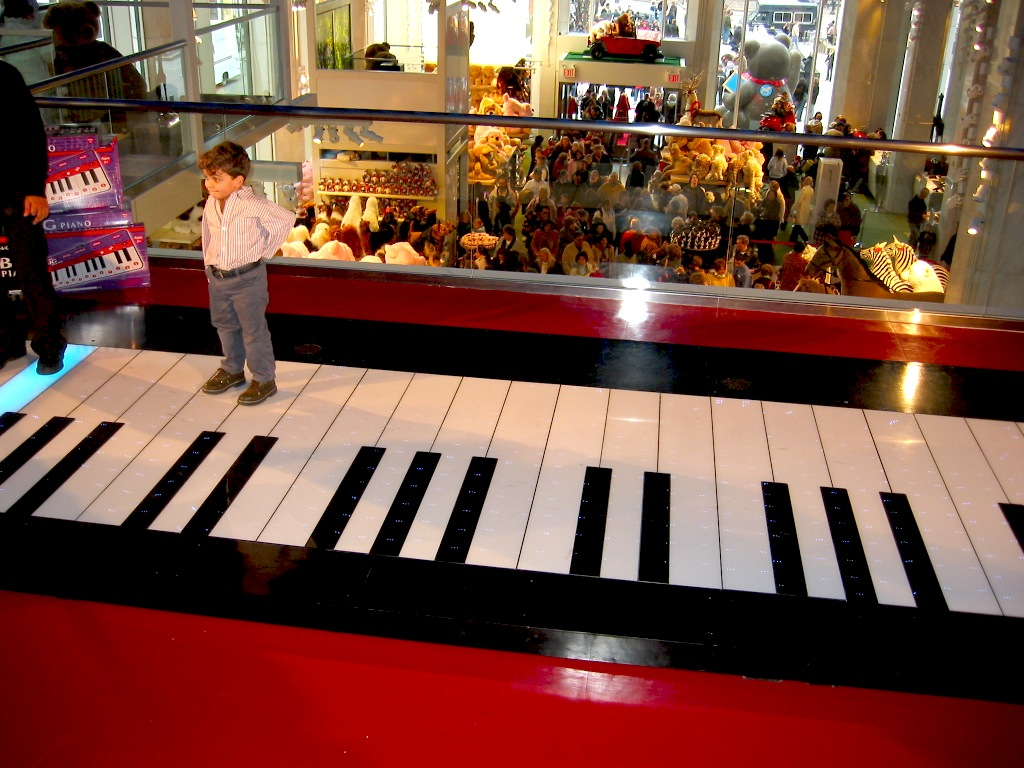
Walking Piano at FAO Schwarz, Fifth Avenue, New York City, 2004

The Walking Piano, also called the Big Piano by its creator, Remo Saraceni, is an oversized synthesizer. Merging dance, music, and play, it is played by the user's feet tapping the keys to make music. Versions of the piano have been installed in museums, children's hospitals, and other public places around the world.

== History ==
Remo Saraceni created a musical daisy for the Bicentennial Celebration in Philadelphia (Design for Fun). From there the concept grew. It took shape with an intermediate stop at an interactive futon, and the first "Big Piano" was built in 1982. The piano was on display at the FAO Schwarz toy store in New York City when screenwriter and producer Anne Spielberg saw it and told her brother, director Steven Spielberg, about it.

== Versions ==
An early, one-octave version of the Walking Piano was installed at FAO Schwarz in New York City in 1982. A new three-octave version specifically created for the 1988 movie Big at the request of director Penny Marshall was played by Tom Hanks and Robert Loggia. That piano was housed in the Please Touch Museum in Philadelphia, Pennsylvania until about 2013. Another version of the piano was made by Elliot Seth Newman, CEO and founder of Kids Station Toys. This version was sold at select retail stores such as Target, Toys R Us, Walmart, and others. This version was sold as the, "Kids Station Toys: Step-On Piano." The product retailed for about $40 USD. Kids Station Toys made many other piano related toys that succeeded and successfully made millions, the top being the, "Fisher PriceTM Elephant Piano."

== Reception ==
The Walking Piano has continued to enjoy media success, appearing in movies such as The Night Before starring Seth Rogen, Anthony Mackie, and Joseph Gordon-Levitt. It has also featured in TV series such as Dancing With The Stars, Puttin' On the Ritz, The Simpsons and The Voice Season Premier Feat John Legend. It was also named as one of the most iconic movie props ever.

== See also ==
- Piano
- Digital piano
- Fortepiano
- Musical keyboard
- Organ (music)
- Electric organ
- Dance Chimes – Foot-operated chime-like musical instrument
