= Ri Happy =

Brazilian toy retailer

- Logo used since 2019

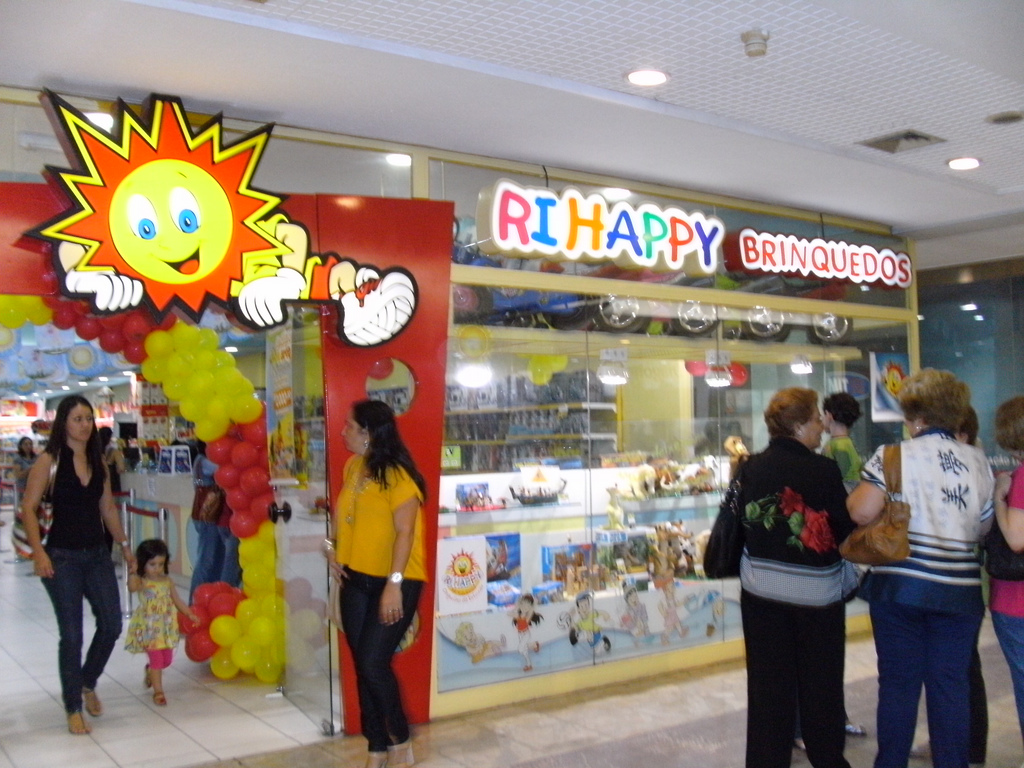
- RiHappy in Mall in Recife, Pernambuco
- Company type: Privately held company
- Industry: Retail
- Founded: 1988; 38 years ago
- Founder: Carlyle Group
- Headquarters: São Paulo, Brazil
- Number of locations: 196 locations
- Area served: Brazil
- Key people: Ronaldo Pereira Junior (CEO)
- Products: Toys; Video games
- Owner: Grupo Ri Happy
- Number of employees: 4000+
- Divisions: Ri Happy Baby

Ri Happy Baby
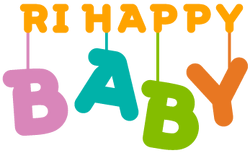
- Founded: 2013; 13 years ago
- Headquarters: São Paulo

Ri Happy Brinquedos, stylised as RI HAPPY, is the largest toy retailer in Brazil.

== History ==
Ri Happy was founded in 1988 by pediatrician Ricardo Sayon, his wife Juanita Sayon, and business administrator Roberto Saba. The name "Ri Happy" derives from "Ri", short for Ricardo, and the English word "happy".

In 2012, the private equity fund The Carlyle Group took majority control of the company by acquiring an 85% stake, making Héctor Núñez its new CEO. In the same year, Ri Happy purchased competitor PBKids.

In 2020, a year after it was reported that it had 196 stores, the retailer appointed Ronaldo Pereira Junior, a former executive who held the same position at Óticas Carol, as its CEO. In the toy and game industry, Ri Happy is the retailer most admired by customers, according to the IBEVAR award.

== Ri Happy Baby ==
In 2013, Ri Happy entered into the baby products sector, opening Ri Happy Baby (stylised as RI HAPPY Baby), a specialised retailer for children under three years old.

== See also ==
Portal: Brazil

- Toy store
