= Big (film) =

1988 film directed by Penny Marshall

- Theatrical release poster
- Directed by: Penny Marshall
- Written by: Gary Ross; Anne Spielberg
- Produced by: James L. Brooks; Robert Greenhut
- Starring: Tom Hanks; Jared Rushton; Elizabeth Perkins; Robert Loggia; John Heard
- Cinematography: Barry Sonnenfeld
- Edited by: Barry Malkin
- Music by: Howard Shore
- Production company: Gracie Films
- Distributed by: 20th Century Fox
- Release date: June 3, 1988
- Running time: 104 minutes (theatrical); 130 minutes (extended edition)
- Country: United States
- Language: English
- Budget: $18 million
- Box office: $151.7 million

Big is a 1988 American fantasy comedy film directed by Penny Marshall and starring Tom Hanks as Josh Baskin, an adolescent boy whose wish to be "big" transforms him physically into an adult. The film also stars Jared Rushton, Elizabeth Perkins, Robert Loggia, and John Heard, and was written by Gary Ross and Anne Spielberg. It was produced by Gracie Films and distributed by 20th Century Fox.

Upon release, Big was met with wide critical acclaim, particularly for Hanks' performance. It was a huge commercial success as well, grossing $151 million worldwide against a production budget of $18 million, and it proved to be pivotal to Hanks' career, establishing him as a major box-office draw as well as a critical favorite. The film received Academy Award nominations for Best Actor (Hanks) and Best Original Screenplay.

== Plot ==
Thirteen-year-old Josh Baskin tries to impress a girl by going on a carnival ride but is rejected as he is too short. Dejected, he inserts a coin into an antique fortune-teller machine called Zoltar, and makes a wish to be "big". It dispenses a card stating "Your wish is granted," but Josh notices the machine has been unplugged the entire time.

The next morning, Josh discovers that he has grown into an adult overnight. Deducing that the Zoltar machine can actually make wishes come true, he tries to locate the machine, but finds that the carnival has moved on. Returning home, he desperately tries to explain his predicament to his mother, who panics and chases him from the house thinking he is a stranger who has kidnapped her son. He then finds his best friend Billy at his school and convinces him of his identity by reciting a song that only they know. With Billy's help, Josh learns that it will take at least six weeks to find the Zoltar machine again, so Josh rents a room in a flophouse in New York City and gets a job as a data entry clerk at the MacMillan Toy Company.

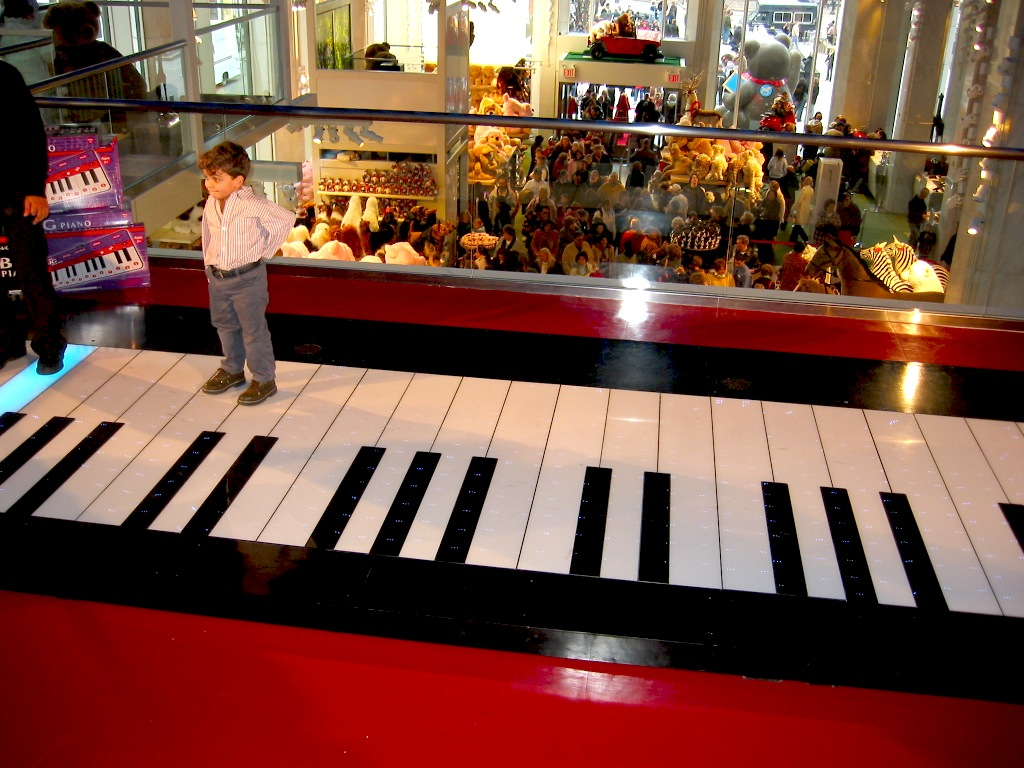
The Walking Piano, as featured in Big

Josh meets the company's owner, Mr. MacMillan, at FAO Schwarz, and impresses him with his insight into current toys and his child-like enthusiasm. They use the store's Walking Piano to play duets ("Heart and Soul" and "Chopsticks"), and MacMillan invites Josh to a massive marketing campaign pitch meeting with senior executives. Unimpressed with the toy being pitched, Josh shocks and challenges the executives with a simple declaration that the toy is not fun, and while his follow-up suggestions invigorate the team for new ideas, he earns the animosity of Paul Davenport, the pitch's leader. Meanwhile, a pleased MacMillan promotes Josh to Vice President of Product Development. He soon attracts the attention of Susan Lawrence, a fellow executive, and a romance begins to develop, much to the dismay of her former boyfriend Davenport. Josh becomes increasingly entwined in his adult life by spending time with Susan, mingling with her friends, and entering into a steady relationship with her. His ideas become valuable assets to MacMillan Toys; however, he begins to forget what it is like to be a child, and his tight schedule rarely allows him to spend time with Billy.

MacMillan asks Josh to come up with proposals for a new line of toys. He is intimidated by the need to formulate the business aspects of the proposal, but Susan says that she will handle the business end while he comes up with the ideas. Nevertheless, he feels pressured and longs for his old life. When he expresses doubts to Susan and attempts to explain that he is a child, she interprets this as fear of commitment on his part and dismisses his explanation.

Josh learns from Billy that the Zoltar machine is now at Sea Point Park, and he leaves in the middle of his presentation to MacMillan and the other executives. Susan follows and encounters Billy, who tells her where Josh went. At the park, Josh finds the machine, unplugs it, and makes a wish to become a child again. Susan confronts him for running off, but upon seeing the machine and the fortune, she realizes that he was telling the truth and becomes despondent that their relationship will end. Josh is grateful for their time together and suggests she use the machine to turn herself into a little girl. Susan declines, but offers to drive Josh back to New Jersey. After sharing an emotional goodbye with Susan, Josh transforms into a child again before reuniting with his family and Billy.

== Cast ==
- Tom Hanks as Joshua "Josh" Baskin
  - David Moscow as Young Josh Baskin
- Jared Rushton as William "Billy" Francis Kopecki
- Elizabeth Perkins as Susan Lawrence
- Robert Loggia as Mr. MacMillan
- John Heard as Paul Davenport
- Jon Lovitz as Scott Brennen
- Mercedes Ruehl as Mrs. Baskin
- Harvey Miller as David, the personnel director
- Debra Jo Rupp as Miss Patterson
- Josh Clark as Mr. Baskin
- Paul Herman as Schizo
- Peter McRobbie as Executive #3
- Kimberlee M. Davis as Cynthia Benson

== Production ==
The Italian film Da grande (1987) has been said to be the inspiration for Big. Gary Ross and Anne Spielberg developed the story in one hour; days after the script was completed they sold it to James L. Brooks and 20th Century Fox. Anne's brother Steven Spielberg was attached to direct the film and wanted to cast Harrison Ford as Josh but Spielberg dropped out due to scheduling conflicts with Empire of the Sun (1987). Ford also pursued other projects instead. Spielberg would later say that his decision to not direct the film was not to take any credit away from his sister.

After Spielberg and Ford left the project and Penny Marshall took over as director, a plethora of talent was considered for the lead role of Josh. Among the talent in discussions included Kevin Costner, Steve Guttenberg, Warren Beatty, Dennis Quaid and Matthew Modine. Quaid turned it down for another project, a decision he later regretted. Albert Brooks was also offered the role but turned it down as he did not want to play a kid. Jeff Bridges was offered the part as well but ultimately didn't feel he was the right choice for it. John Travolta wanted to play Josh, but the studio wasn't interested in casting him. Sean Penn was considered for the role, but Marshall deemed him too young; Gary Busey auditioned for the role, but Marshall did not think he could pull off playing an adult. Andy García read for Josh, but one of the studio executives did not want to spend $18 million for "a kid to grow to be Puerto Rican" (García is actually Cuban). Debra Winger tried to convince Marshall to rewrite Josh as a woman. Marshall also auditioned other comic male actors for the role, but she found their performances "too broad".

Ultimately, Robert De Niro was cast in the lead role with Elizabeth Perkins. He later dropped out due to "scheduling conflicts" and was replaced by Tom Hanks. Hanks and Loggia made two cardboard pianos and practiced them at home; the studio hired doubles in case Hanks and Loggia did not get it right. Prior to filming, Hanks spent time with Jared Rushton and David Moscow and attempted to emulate Moscow's body language and acting style in order to make a convincing performance of being the adult version of the child actor.

At the time of the film's release, Big (1988) was part of a series of twin films featuring an age-changing plot produced during the late 1980s, including Like Father Like Son (1987), 18 Again! (1988), Vice Versa (1988) and 14 Going on 30 (1988).

== Reception ==
=== Box office ===
During its opening weekend, the film opened in second place behind Crocodile Dundee II, earning $8.2 million. The film ultimately grossed nearly $115 million in the United States and Canada and $36.7 million internationally, totaling $151.7 million worldwide. It was the first feature film directed by a woman to gross over $100 million.

=== Critical response ===
Janet Maslin of The New York Times praised Hanks's performance, writing "Wide-eyed, excited and wonderfully guileless, [he] is an absolute delight, and the film is shrewd in relieving him of the responsibility to behave furtively and hide his altered condition." Gene Siskel of the Chicago Tribune felt "Hanks proves himself to be an adept comedian here"; however, he wrote the film "is at its best when romance blooms at a toy company where Elizabeth Perkins is an executive and Hanks has become a star vice president with his innocent approach to picking best-selling toys." Roger Ebert, in his Chicago Sun-Times review, wrote:

Big is a tender, soft-hearted, and cheerful movie, well-directed by Penny Marshall and with a script by Anne Spielberg and Gary Ross that has a lot of fun with simple verbal misunderstandings ...Hanks, who had a tendency to push too hard, I thought, in Nothing in Common, this time finds a vulnerability and sweetness for his character that's quite appealing.

Jay Boyar of the Orlando Sentinel highlighted Hanks for his "invincible amiability" and further wrote "Elizabeth Perkins gives a smart, sexy performance as Susan, and Robert Loggia has a crusty whimsicality as Josh's boss." Altogether, he wrote "Big isn't a heavy-message movie, but there are a couple of ideas behind it, ideas that help focus the action. Marshall and the screenwriters want us to know that we should stay in touch with the child inside us." Duane Byrge, reviewing for The Hollywood Reporter, wrote: "Keeping it spry and winningly light, director Penny Marshall doesn't hammer any themes or satire into the film; she, quite shrewdly, keeps Big likeably small. The comedy is natural and unforced, in no small part because of Hanks' wonderfully slapstick performance." Kevin Thomas of the Los Angeles Times felt the film "manages to be funny, warm, sophisticated and above all, imaginative, from start to finish ... It is also a personal triumph for Tom Hanks; Nothing in Common and now Big confirm his position as the screen's premier young light comedian. Hanks recalls the amiable charm of the young Jimmy Stewart and Jack Lemmon, yet his bemused personality is as contemporary as the yuppies he plays so well." John Simon of the National Review described Big as "an accomplished, endearing, and by no means mindless fantasy".

On the review aggregator Rotten Tomatoes, the film scored a 98% rating based on 81 reviews, with an average rating of 8/10. The website's critical consensus reads, "Refreshingly sweet and undeniably funny, Big is a showcase for Tom Hanks, who dives into his role and infuses it with charm and surprising poignancy." On Metacritic, the film has a weighted average score of 73 out of 100, based on 20 critics. Audiences polled by CinemaScore gave the film an average grade of "A" on an A+ to F scale.

=== Accolades ===
Award	Category	Recipient(s)	Result	Ref.
Academy Awards	Academy Award for Best Actor	Tom Hanks	Nominated	
Academy Awards	Academy Award for Best Original Screenplay	Gary Ross and Anne Spielberg	Nominated	
Golden Globe Awards	Golden Globe Award for Best Motion Picture – Musical or Comedy	—N/a	Nominated	
Golden Globe Awards	Golden Globe Award for Best Actor – Motion Picture Musical or Comedy	Tom Hanks	Won	

The film is number 23 on Bravo's 100 Funniest Movies. In 2000, it was ranked 42nd on the American Film Institute's "100 Years…100 Laughs" list. In June 2008, AFI named it the tenth-best film in the fantasy genre. In 2008, it was selected by Empire as one of "The 500 Greatest Movies of All Time."

The film is recognized by American Film Institute in these lists:

- 2000: AFI's 100 Years...100 Laughs – #42
- 2008: AFI's 10 Top 10: #10 Fantasy Film

== Adaptations ==
=== Film remakes ===
In 2004, Indian remakes titled New in Tamil-language starring S.J. Suryah and Naani starring Mahesh Babu in Telugu-language were released. Also, an Indian Hindi-language remake titled Aao Wish Karein starring Aftab Shivdasani was released in 2009.

=== Broadway musical ===
In 1996, the film was adapted into a Broadway musical. It featured music by David Shire, lyrics by Richard Maltby Jr., and a book by John Weidman. Directed by Mike Ockrent, and choreographed by Susan Stroman, it opened on April 28, 1996, and closed on October 13, 1996, after 193 performances.

=== Television show ===
The first attempt at adapting the film as a television series came in 1990, with a sitcom pilot produced for CBS that starred Bruce Norris as Josh, Alison La Placa as Susan, and Darren McGavin as Mr. MacMillan; it was not picked up as a series.

On September 30, 2014, Fox announced that a television remake, loosely based on the film, was planned. Written and executive produced by Kevin Biegel and Mike Royce, it dealt with what it means to be an adult and kid in present times.

== In popular culture ==
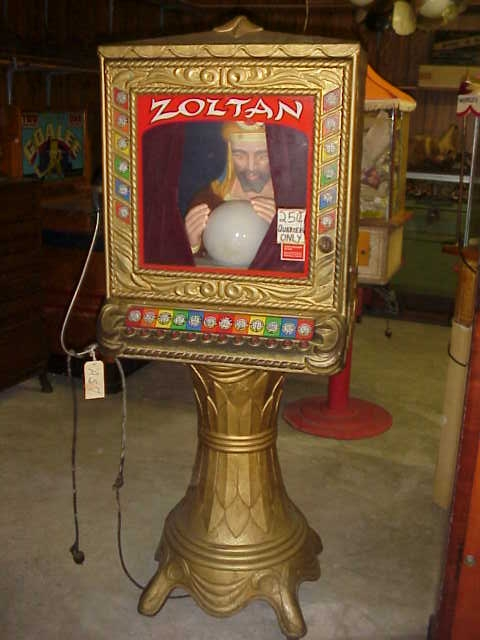
A Zoltan fortune-teller at Gameroom Show

The fictional Zoltar Speaks fortune-telling machine portrayed in the film was modeled after the real-life 1960s machine Zoltan, the name differing by one letter. In 2007, the Nevada-based animatronic company Characters Unlimited was awarded a trademark for Zoltar Speaks and began selling fortune-telling machines with that name.

Big is referenced in the DC Extended Universe (DCEU) feature film Shazam!. (Both films' plots center around a child who is magically transformed into an adult.) When the villain Doctor Sivana chases Billy Batson into a toy store, Billy unknowingly steps onto a Walking Piano and briefly plays it before being knocked out a window by Sivana.

The machine makes an appearance in some episodes of the TV series The Order. In "Free Radicals, Part 2" (season 2, episode 2), Alyssa shows Jack their vault of magical artifacts, which she describes as "the beating heart of the Order." It contains objects such as Excalibur and the Ark of the Covenant as well as a Zoltar fortune-telling machine. Alyssa explains that it's an "enchanted" Zoltar machine that makes wishes come true. After Jack says he wishes to know his major, Alyssa quickly warns him that Zoltar is a "bit of a trickster" who "grants your wishes ironically." The machine is among the artifacts stolen by the demon summoned by the Knights of Saint Christopher.

== See also ==
- 13 Going on 30 (2004)
- Little – A film with a reverse theme
- 17 Again – A film with a teen theme
