= A Girl's Story (short story) =

Short story by Toni Cade Bambara

"A Girl's Story" is a short story within Toni Cade Bambara's short story collection, The Seabirds are Still Alive. This collection was originally published in 1977 by Random House. Bambara writes about strong female girls in this particular collection because "in her vision, in her politics, little girls matter". The story centers on a young, African American girl named Rae Ann who is experiencing menstruation for the first time.

== Plot summary ==
In "A Girl's Story", Rae Ann, the main character, thinks she is bleeding to death. She does not know that it is the start of her menstrual cycle, something no one had told her about. She lives with her brother Horace and her grandmother, M'Dear. In this environment, they do not speak of such things. Rae Ann is terrified of the blood that keeps coming out of her and uses towels, tissues, and other methods to try to stop it. At the beginning she is hoisting her hips up toward a wall, thinking it would go back in. She becomes so frightened that she thinks of going to the Center, where Dada Bibi is, and asking her for help. She becomes too afraid to, thinking she would only bleed to death on the way. Rae Ann starts to think of her situation as a punishment and of her dead mother who bled to death. When Horace came home and wanted to use the bathroom, he yells at her to come out. After she refuses him, he calls on M'Dear who then jumps to the conclusion that Rae Ann had attempted an abortion like her Mother. Rae Ann is confused, not knowing what an abortion is, let alone to tell her grandmother otherwise. When M'Dear finally sees her and understands that it was only her period, she sits her down on newspaper in her room, leaving her with a package. The story ends with this scene and Rae Ann thinks she has done something horrible. M'Dear does not explain anything to her, just leaves a package of products and instructions for Rae Ann to figure out on her own.

== Characters ==
- Rae Ann - main character, young, African American girl
- Horace - Rae Ann's brother
- M'Dear - Rae Ann's grandmother
- Dada Bibi - works at the Center, African woman, Rae Ann's sister

== Themes ==
- African American Culture & Socio-Economic Status:

African American girls are known to hit puberty and menstruation a lot earlier than other races in American and thus are more likely to have some sort of maladjustment. Similarly Socio-Economic status also affects this adjustment, “...with the knowledge that poverty affects many aspects of adolescent development, it is not unreasonable to expect a link between socioeconomic status and a girl’s emotional and psychological reactions to her first period,” With this connection of poverty to a girl’s reaction and her race, Rae Ann had many factors against her understanding and acceptance of her womanhood.

- Female Shame & Worth:

Rae Ann comes to a moment in her life, unknown to her, that transitions her body from a girl to a woman. She instinctively knew that this change, the nonstop bleeding, was some sort of punishment, to be hidden and disguised. She associated "becoming a woman" with the nagging, one way conversations of M'Dear that cautioned her from engaging with boys who would take advantage of her. The reaction M'Dear gives her when she finds out is dismissive and cold; she gives Rae Ann a package and leaves her without a word. These examples give basis for Rae Ann's shame of her own body and reinforces her to keep quiet about her transformation. This reflects the reactions that are experienced by women and girls who do not have access to information about their bodies. A study of 120 African American women found that two-thirds of them were not prepared or knowledgeable about menstruation, this is twice the percentage compared to a similar study of white females. The study also showed that those who experience menstruation for the first time have "overall feelings of shame, embarrassment, surprise, offensiveness, fear, anxiety, sadness, and even naughtiness..."

- Strong "Girl" image:

Toni Cade Bambara references the power of young girls in reversing the oppressions that the African American and International communities face. She puts the most vulnerable and disenfranchised at the center of her stories where they take active roles, rather than the typical passivity that is expected of them. Rae Ann is active in her search for answers to life questions, particularly from Dada Bibi's stories and advice. She thinks and acts through her situation, rather than becoming paralyzed by fear.

== Symbols ==
- Dada Bibi's Story:

Dada Bibi would tell stories to the girls at The Center, about the African Queens. Rae Ann loved the story about one woman who continued to refuse a man's proposal of marriage, saying she had to become a soldier instead. Her country was not at peace and there was a lot of suffering with the Europeans there, so the man bought her armor. The African Queen only accepted the man once the war was over and there was peace and prosperity in their land. Rae Ann thought of current times where women were treated by men; men would yell for their women and if they did not come, they left them. The story tells of a strong woman with free-will and power, where in current times, Rae Ann sees women as weak and inferior to men. The Story symbolizes Rae Ann's own transformation into a strong, powerful woman through the onset of her first menstruation.

- Blood:

Blood in the story is a direct representation of the inevitability of Rae Ann's transformation into a woman and adult. No matter what she does, she cannot get rid of it, or determine its origin. Blood does not easily wash out or disappear; Rae Ann hides her ruined clothing and does not what to do with the blood-stained towels of M'Dear's. She knows that blood means death, illness, and more personally, her mother's death. Her mother dies from a harmful, illegal abortion, to which she literally bleeds to death.

- Abortion: Rae Ann’s condition is mistaken for an abortion by her grandmother, who saw her mother die from one. This symbolizes the disconnection between Rae Ann and her grandmother, in that both do not communicate honestly with each other. Neither explains their situation, or helps each other to understand their dilemmas. This represents the shame involved with sex and illness, and one's reproductive organs. This shame connects Rae Ann's ideas of menstruation and death together, causing an even worse attitude towards life and sex as she gets older.

== Illness narrative ==
- View of Death and Illness: A Girl’s Story as healing narrative:

The narration of the story centers on one young girl’s experience with what she conceived as a near-death experience. Rae Ann "equates menstruation with illness and death, associating it with foul smells and dark bloodstains". Rae Ann deals with her situation by fighting the blood that keeps coming out of her. She does not accept her situation and refuses to be defeated by death. She thinks of the people Dada Bibi references from Africa and other countries that sacrifice themselves for their countries' upheavals. Rae Ann does not want to die, even for a good cause. She sees herself as selfless, but she sees more power in continuing to live and make changes in the world. The bleeding becomes healing for her in that she becomes aware of her potential as a person and as a woman.

- Body Disconnection:

“For many girl participants, menarche had no special meaning beyond bleeding or passing blood from the vagina,” this illustrates the disconnection between one’s body functions that are a representation of life, with just blood – no other function. While Rae Ann had no conception whatsoever with reproduction in correlation with her bleeding, other girls just choose to observe this bleeding as only being about annoyance and inconvenience. While Rae Ann's experience was that of illness, death, and terror.

- Betrayal, Terror, Loss, Loneliness

Rae Ann sees her bleeding as a death or illness, connecting it with the loss of her mother. She goes through the four stages of illness that Michael Stein analyzes in his book, The Lonely Patient: How We Experience Illness - Betrayal, terror, loss, and loneliness. This betrayal of her body is foremost in her mind, for she keeps trying to make herself normal by stopping herself up with tissue and towels. She is trying to recreate the condition she was in before; she is mad at her body that makes her feel scared and confused. As for terror, she starts to panic that she may be dying like her mother had, since she seems to be losing a lot of blood. She thinks of telling her brother, so he can take her to the Center where Dada Bibi is, but becomes terrified that she would die before she gets there. Literally and figuratively, she feels the loss of her mother; she feels the loss of herself and all that she could have achieved if only she could live longer. Finally, at the end of the story, she feels alone because of M’Dear’s answers none of her confusion or terror. She is literally put in her room alone, creating a last image of her on her bed with newspapers beneath her. She finds herself more alone in the world than she ever was before.

- Women & Illness:

"The power of medical discourses has also been emphasized, in that the menstrual cycle is depicted as medical and even pathological; it leads to discomfort, illness and emotional instability," This idea that menstruation is a pathological act and is considered an illness demonstrates the shame associated with a young girls’ experience with it. When one is bleeding, like Rae Ann, without reason, an automatic assumption of illness is logical and makes the person feel even more ashamed.
