= Encore Books =

Defunct American bookstore chain

- Industry: bookstore
- Founder: David Schlessinger
- Defunct: 1999
- Headquarters: United States
- Area served: Delaware; New Jersey; Pennsylvania; New York; Massachusetts; New Hampshire

Encore Books was a regional chain of bookstores based in the eastern United States until its closure in 1999.

== Founding ==
Encore Books was started by David Schlessinger, who went on to found the Zany Brainy and Five Below retail chains. It enjoyed a prosperous early life and was sold to the Rite Aid Corporation, which later spun the company off.

== Troubles ==
By the time of its closure, the 50 Encore Books locations were owned by Lauriat's, a 127-year-old company based in Canton, Massachusetts. Problems were legion in the company's final years. A leveraged buyout, rapid expansion, and difficulty working with publishers due to competition from Borders and Barnes & Noble had forced the company into bankruptcy. Lauriat's had already gone through a round of store closings by the time the closure of the entire chain was announced. In 1999, the company closed the 71 stores that operated under the Lauriat's, Book Corner and Encore names.

== Stores ==
Most Encore Books locations were small operations, similar to the B. Dalton and Waldenbooks stores popular in the 1970s and 1980s. However, the company operated two large stores, dubbed Encore Books and Music—complete with a music section, plush chairs, and a coffee shop—in Princeton, New Jersey, and Mechanicsburg, Pennsylvania. Its two other largest stores operated in State College, Pennsylvania, and Middletown, New York. It operated a smaller, but very successful store on the campus of the University of Pennsylvania in Philadelphia throughout the 1970s and 1980s.
