= Frederick August Otto Schwarz =

Founder Of FAO Schwarz

- Born: October 18, 1836; Herford, Province of Westphalia, Kingdom of Prussia, German Confederation
- Died: May 17, 1911 (aged 74); New York City, U.S.
- Resting place: Green-Wood Cemetery
- Occupation: Businessman
- Spouse: Caroline Clausen
- Children: 7, including Herbert
- Relatives: Charles Henry Schwarz (brother); Frederick A.O. Schwarz Jr. (great-grandson)

Frederick August Otto Schwarz (October 18, 1836 – May 17, 1911) was a German-born American toy retailer known for founding FAO Schwarz.

== Biography ==
Schwarz was born to a German Lutheran family in 1836 at Herford, Province of Westphalia, Kingdom of Prussia and immigrated to the United States in 1856 with his three brothers, Henry, Richard, and Gustav. He worked for a Baltimore stationery importer. In an effort to increase their exports, German exporters occasionally combined stationery with toys and other goods. Toys that Schwarz displayed in the window of the store outsold stationery. By 1862 he had switched to selling the toys from his own shop, and in 1870 he moved his business to Manhattan in New York City. He married Caroline Clausen (1841–1904). Together they had four sons and three daughters: Anna Schwarz (1863–1933), Ida Schwarz (1864–1942), Henry Schwarz, George Frederick Schwarz (1868–1931), Emilie Schwarz (1870–1958), H. Marshall Schwarz, and Herbert Ferlando Schwarz (1883–1960). Frederick August Otto Schwarz died at his home in Manhattan at 20 East 61st Street. Schwarz is buried in Green-Wood Cemetery.

Frederick August Otto Schwarz Jr. is his great grandson.
