= FAO Schwarz =

American toy brand and store

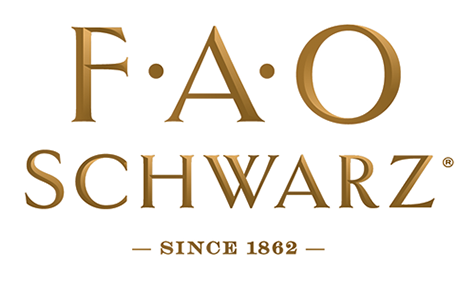
- Type: Private
- Industry: Toys
- Founded: 1862; 164 years ago (as Toy Bazaar); Baltimore, Maryland, U.S.
- Founder: Frederick August Otto Schwarz
- Headquarters: Rockefeller Center, New York City, New York, U.S. 40.7634°N 73.9723°W
- Number of locations: 6
- Products: Toys; games; clothing; baby products
- Owner: Morse Partners (1986–1990); ThreeSixty Group (since 2016)
- Parent: W. R. Grace and Company (1970–1974); Christiana Companies (1985–1986); Vendex KBB (1990–2001); Right Start (2001–2004); Toys "R" Us (2009–2016)
- Website: www.faoschwarz.com

FAO Schwarz is an American toy brand and retail chain. The company features high-end toys, toys exclusive to them, life-sized stuffed animals, interactive experiences, brand integrations, and games.

FAO Schwarz claims to be the oldest toy retailer in the United States, founded by its namesake, Frederick August Otto Schwarz, in 1862 in Baltimore before moving to New York City, where it has had several locations since 1870. The dance-on piano, made famous by the 1988 Tom Hanks film Big, brought international attention to the brand.

The company filed for bankruptcy twice in 2003 before temporarily shuttering the Fifth Avenue location in January 2004. In May 2009, Toys "R" Us acquired FAO Schwarz. In 2015, it permanently closed the Fifth Avenue location. ThreeSixty Group later acquired the brand, and opened a new FAO Schwarz location at 30 Rockefeller Plaza in November 2018. In 2019, ThreeSixty opened locations in Chicago, Beijing, London, and Dublin.

The "FAO Schwarz" brand name and trademarks are owned by the FAO Schwarz Family Foundation and exclusively licensed to the ThreeSixty Group, which owns and operates the retail locations.

== Retail locations ==
The FAO Schwarz global flagship is at 30 Rockefeller Plaza in Midtown Manhattan. Its Chicago location is inside Midway International Airport. The London store is in Selfridges. Its Beijing store is in China World Shopping Mall in Chaoyang District, operating in collaboration with Kidsland, China’s largest toy distributor. Comprising 30,000 sq ft on two floors, the Beijing store features a clock tower on the facade, a rocket ship, a custom racecar crafting station, and a replica of the giant piano from the movie Big. The FAO Schwarz flagship store in Dublin is in Arnotts department store on Henry Street.

== History ==
=== Early history ===
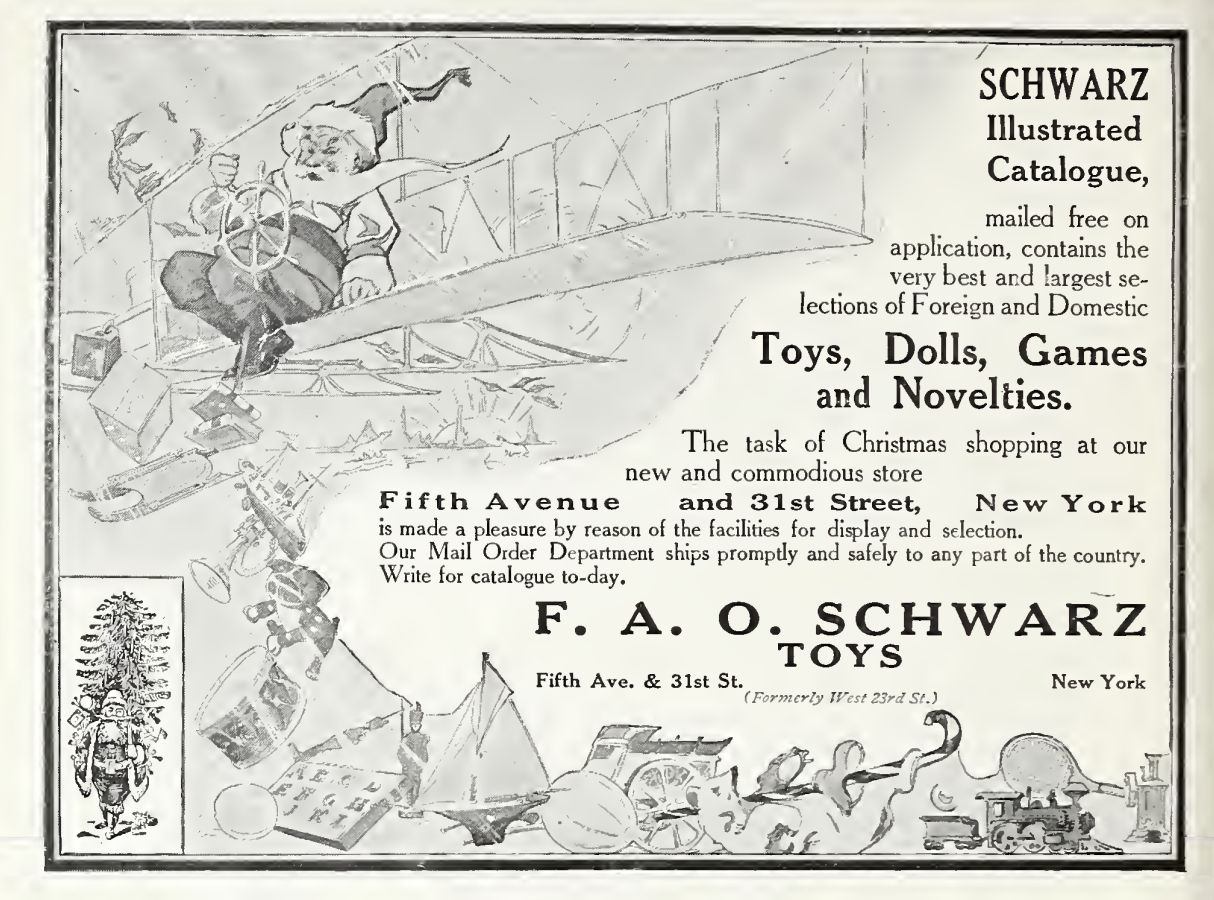
1910 F.A.O Schwarz Advertisement

FAO Schwarz was founded in 1862 in Baltimore under the name "Toy Bazaar" by German immigrant Frederick August Otto Schwarz.

In 1870, Schwarz opened a New York City location known as the "Schwarz Toy Bazaar" at 765 Broadway, which moved to 42 E. 14th Street in Union Square in 1880 and operated at that location until April 28, 1897, when it took over two vacant store locations at 39 and 41 W. 23rd Street. That year, The New York Times declared Schwarz as "the largest dealer in toys in this city."

Beginning in November 1869, the Schwarz Toy Bazaar held an exhibition of toys that would be available for the Christmas season. In 1896, Schwarz proclaimed the store as the "Original Santa Claus Headquarters" in New York. The FAO Schwarz holiday catalog has been published annually since 1876.

In 1931, the New York City location moved to 745 Fifth Avenue, where it operated for 55 years. In 1963, Parent's Magazine Enterprises purchased FAO Schwarz. The terms of the deal read that it would license the name FAO Schwarz and continue using it for a maximum of five years before dropping the name, while still paying the Schwarz family a royalty on sales. However, the lease was renewed as the owners felt the name was too significant to lose. Part of the price of keeping the name was to keep the royalty agreement, and the Schwarz family set up a foundation to fund opportunities for young people to work in nonprofit with the income the royalties were making. Nine percent of the company remained in the hands of the Schwarz family. The company subsequently sold to W.R. Grace in 1970, and then to toy retailer Franz Carl Weber of Zurich, Switzerland, in 1974.

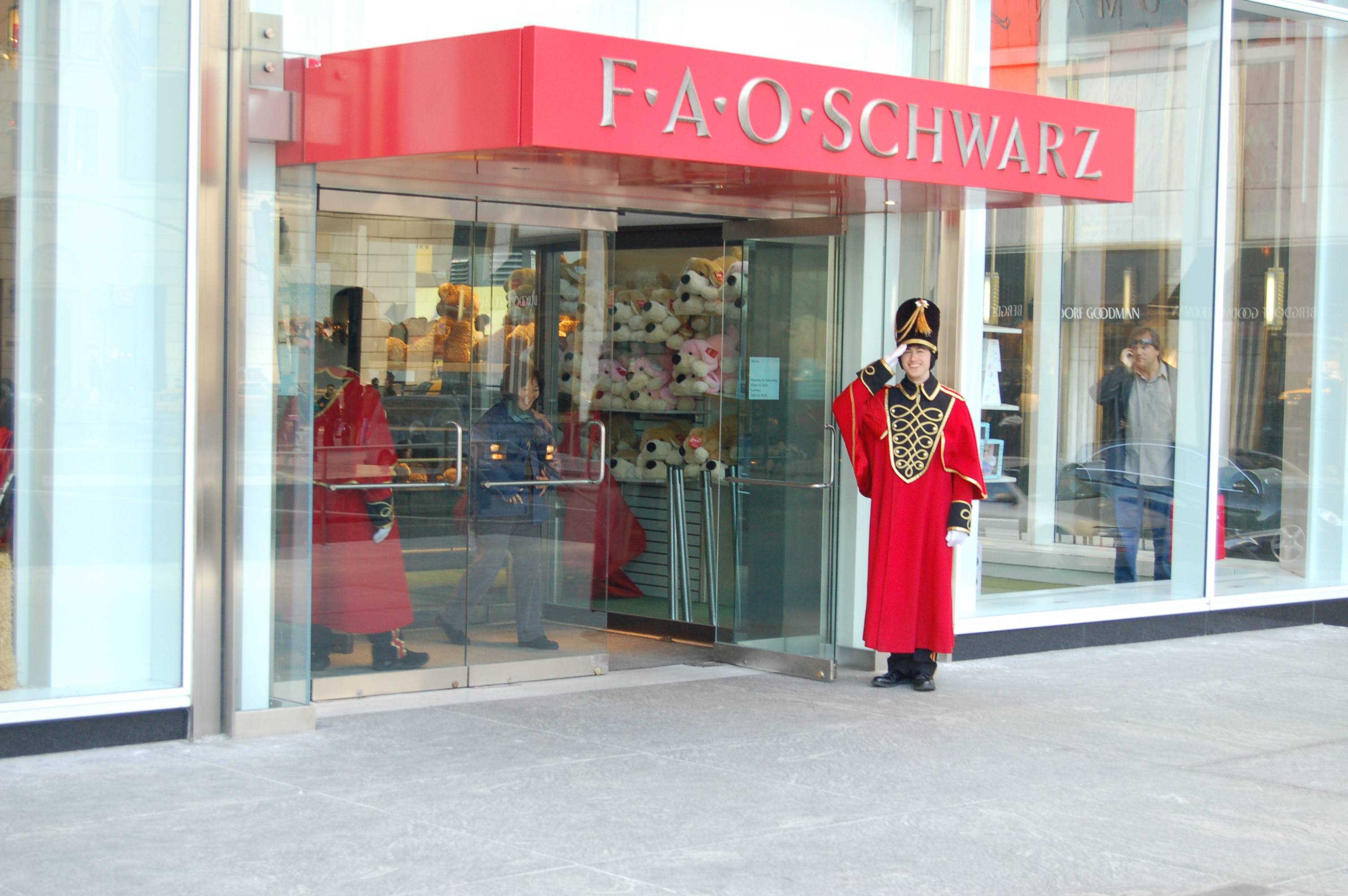
Storefront at the General Motors Building in Manhattan

In 1985, Christiana Companies, a company based in San Diego, California, owned FAO Schwarz for one year. In 1986, Peter Harris, with the help of Philadelphia investment banker Peter Morse, bought the company under Morse Partners Ltd. and moved the toy store across 58th Street to the General Motors Building at 767 Fifth Avenue at 58th Street. FAO Schwarz was sold to Netherlands-based NV Koninklijke Bijenkorf Beheer (later renamed Royal Vendex/KBB NV) in 1990. Throughout the 1990s, new FAO Schwarz stores opened across the United States; by 2000, the company had 40 locations.

=== Right Start, FAO Inc. and bankruptcy ===
In 2001, the Calabasas-based toy retailer Right Start, Inc. purchased 23 of the 40 stores, including the Fifth Avenue flagship store, from Royal Vendex for somewhere between $50 million and $60 million.

In 2002, Right Start Inc. changed its corporate name to FAO Inc. operating stores under The Right Start, Zany Brainy and FAO Schwarz names. On December 17, the company projected they would file for bankruptcy if its bank did not relax borrowing restrictions. On January 13, 2003, FAO Inc. filed for bankruptcy, but emerged from it three months later in April. The company filed for bankruptcy a second time in December 2003. All 13 remaining FAO Schwarz locations closed in January 2004 as a result of the bankruptcy, with the flagship Fifth Avenue store expected to reopen in July of that year but the others closing for good. The Fifth Avenue store reopened several months later than planned on Thanksgiving Day 2004, redesigned and renovated to accommodate a growing number of tourists, and the Las Vegas location at The Forum Shops at Caesars ultimately remained open until 2010.

=== D. E. Shaw & Co. ===
In February 2004, investment firm D. E. Shaw & Co., L.P., acquired the FAO Schwarz stores in New York and Las Vegas, as well as FAO Schwarz's catalog and internet business. The New York and Las Vegas stores reopened on Thanksgiving Day 2004. In November 2007, FAO Schwarz acquired premium children's clothing company Best & Co., which had plans to expand, but the company ceased business in 2009.

=== Toys "R" Us, Inc. ===
In May 2009, Toys "R" Us Inc. acquired FAO Schwarz. In 2009, Toys "R" Us subsequently put temporary FAO Schwarz boutiques in its U.S. Toys "R" Us stores for the holidays, and in October 2010, the concept was expanded into permanent boutiques in Toys "R" Us stores. In addition, FAO Schwarz-branded infant and toddler items are available in all of its Babies "R" Us stores nationwide. The company closed the Las Vegas location in January 2010, followed by its previous flagship New York store.

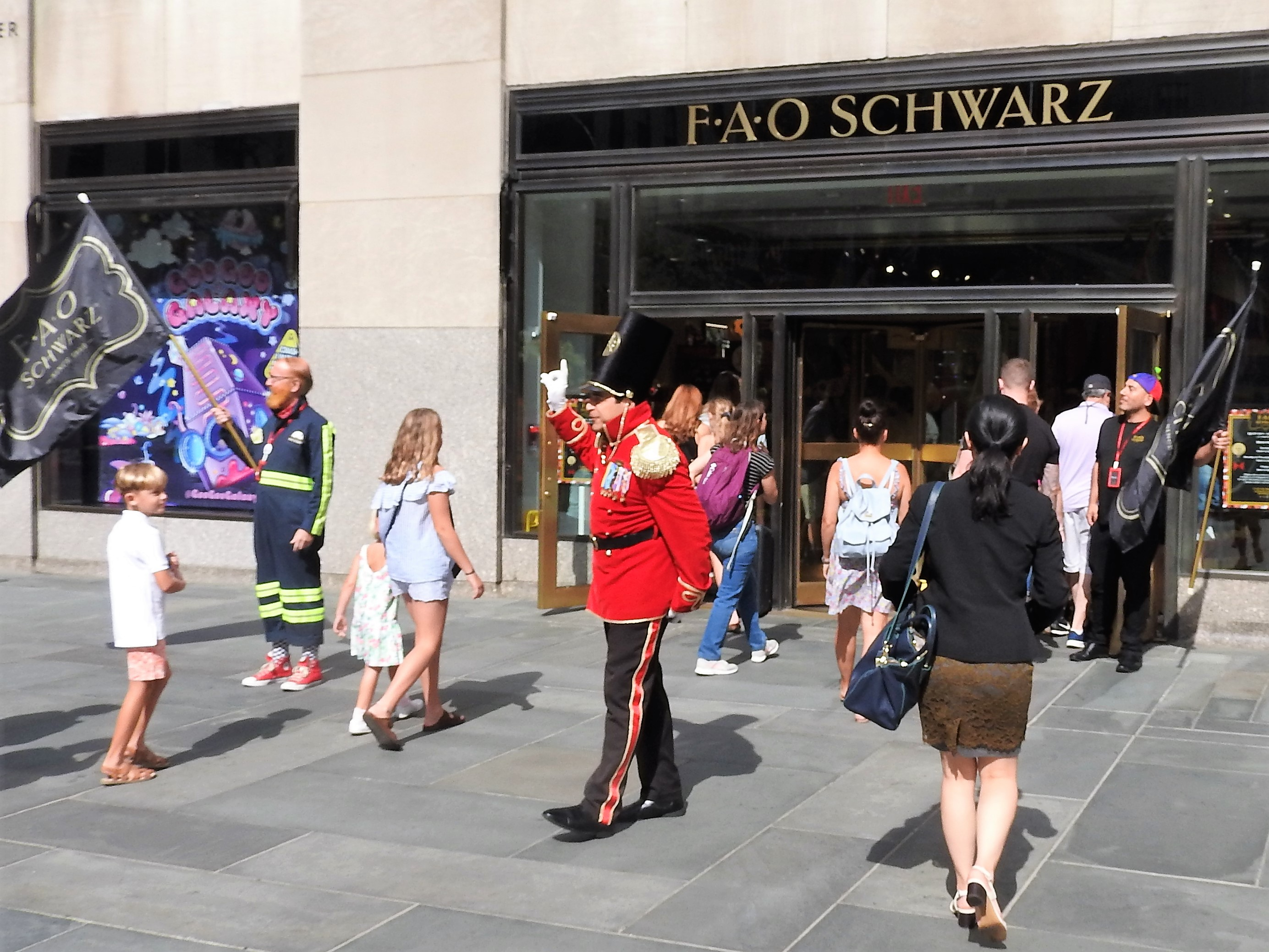
FAO Schwarz door opening ceremony at 30 Rockefeller Plaza

=== ThreeSixty Group ===
In October 2016, ThreeSixty Group, Inc. acquired FAO Schwarz from Toys ‘R’ Us, Inc.

The FAO Schwarz brand is currently the property of the descendants of the founder through the FAO Schwarz Family Foundation but is exclusively operated by ThreeSixty Group. In August 2018, ThreeSixty Group announced plans to open two new FAO Schwarz stores in New York. The one at 30 Rockefeller Plaza in Rockefeller Center opened on November 16, 2018. The store features live toy demonstrations and carries many toys that are hard to find in the United States such as BRIO. Public transit access is available at 47th–50th Streets–Rockefeller Center station. The second opened at LaGuardia Airport in December 2018.

In October 2018, FAO Schwarz pop-up stores opened at 90 Hudson's Bay Company stores across Canada, just ahead of the Christmas holiday season, to remain open through the holidays.

In March 2019, a store opened at Midway International Airport in Chicago.

Also in 2019, an F.A.O. Schwartz shop opened in Arnotts department store in Ireland, replacing its original toy shop.

In November 2021, a store opened in Milan.

In spring 2024, a new location opened in Paris at Galeries Lafayette Haussmann department store.

== Brand ==
FAO Schwarz is known for its large assortment of plush animals and the Piano Dance Mat, a smaller replica of The Walking Piano featured in the Tom Hanks film Big. FAO Schwarz also features limited-quantity luxury items including a drivable, child-size automobile encrusted with over 40,000 crystals and valued at US$25,000.

In addition to its own line of products, FAO Schwarz carries brands including Steiff, the world's oldest (founded 1880) German designer of stuffed animals; Melissa & Doug, a leading designer and manufacturer of educational toys; and Build-A-Bear Workshop, a make-your-own experience featuring a selection of exclusive FAO Schwarz stuffed animals and accessories, among other in-store retail partners.

When Kinectimals: Now with Bears! was released, the brand also released an exclusive teddy bear plush with a scan tag.

=== Logo ===
Through the years, the FAO Schwarz logo has had versions that included a teddy bear, toy blocks, a toy soldier, rocking horse and an animated clock tower. In 2010, the FAO Schwarz logo was redesigned in colors of red and silver. The new logo emphasized the initials of company founder, Frederick August Otto Schwarz. It also debuted a company mascot, Wit. In 2017, FAO Schwarz hired design studio, Mattson Creative, to rebrand the FAO Schwarz logo and packaging. Mattson Creative also created the store's reopening tagline and hashtag, "Return to Wonder".

== In popular culture ==
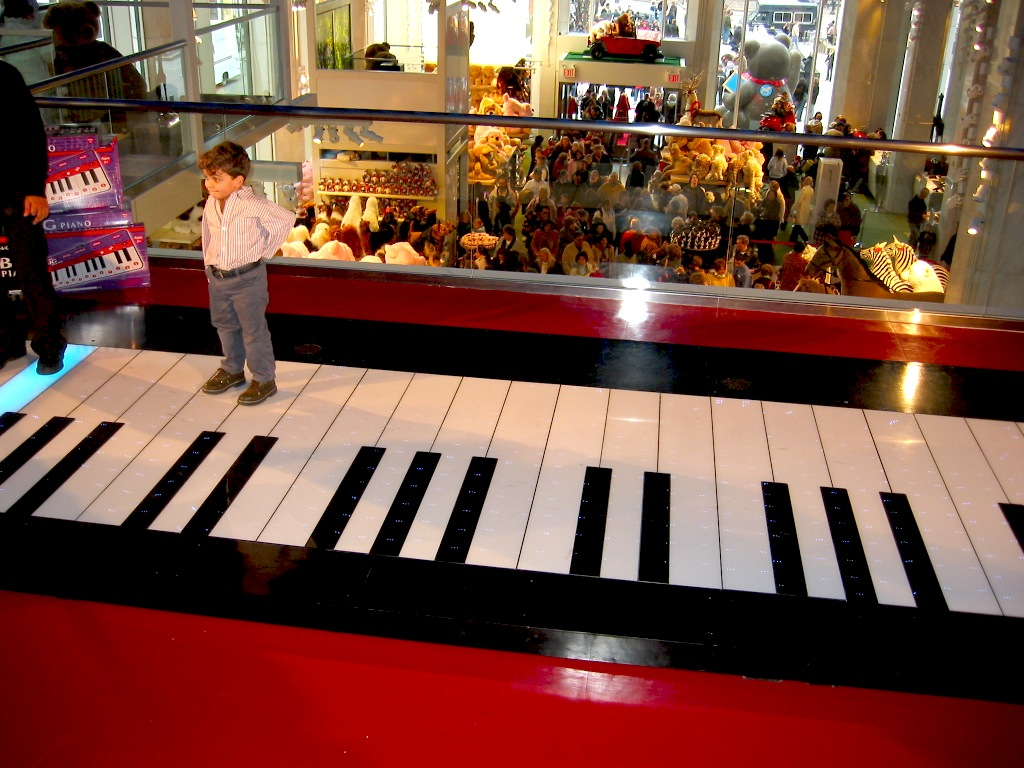
The Walking Piano

In the 1972 short story "The Lesson", the store is cast as an instance of immense wealth disparity between classes to a group of poor children.

The New York store is featured in the 1988 Tom Hanks film Big, in which Hanks and Robert Loggia dance "Heart & Soul" and "Chopsticks" on the store's large dance-on piano.

The store's interior was the inspiration for the fictional "Duncan's Toy Chest" featured in the 1992 film Home Alone 2: Lost in New York. The store is featured in Woody Allen's 1995 film Mighty Aphrodite in the final scene where main characters Lenny and Linda have a chance encounter. It is also featured in Baby Boom (1987) and Big Business (1988), among others.

In the 1999 remake of the musical film Annie, during the song "NYC", the characters Oliver Warbucks, Grace, and Annie join a crowd of people all admiring an impressive Christmas-themed window display containing a sign that reads "F.A.O. Schwarz".

In the 2010 film Toy Story 3, when Buzz Lightyear is captured, Lots-o-Huggin' Bear unties him and indirectly references FAO Schwarz in a euphemism: "Oh F-A-O my Schwarz".

The store is featured in the 2011 film The Smurfs during a chase scene. Scenes from the movie were shot over five nights in May 2011.

In the 2019 episode of The Simpsons, "Crystal Blue-Haired Persuasion", a healing crystal shop is named "FAO Quartz".

In the 2021 series Hawkeye, the climax of the battle between Kate Bishop and Wilson Fisk occurs in the 30 Rockefeller Plaza location. The actual name of the shop is obscured. One shot features Bishop standing on the dance-on piano.
