= Vida =

Vida means “life” in Spanish and Portuguese. It may refer to:

== Geography ==
- Vida (Gradačac), village in Bosnia and Herzegovina
- Lake Vida, Victoria Valley, Antarctica
- U.S. settled places:
  - Vida, Montana
  - Vida, Oregon
  - Vida, Missouri

== Film and television ==
- Vida (TV series), a 2018 American television series
- Vida TV (Angola), a defunct Angolan television channel

== Literature ==
- Vida (Occitan literary form), a medieval literary genre
- Vida (novel), a 1980 novel by Marge Piercy
- Vida: Women in Literary Arts, a non-profit feminist organization

== Music ==
=== Albums ===
- Vida (Sui Generis album), 1972
- Vida, a 1980 album by Chico Buarque
- Vida, a 1988 album by Paloma San Basilio
- Vida, a 1989 album by DC3
- Vida, a 1990 album by Emmanuel
- Vida!..., a 1993 album by Kon Kan
- Vida (La Mafia album), 1994
- Vida, a 1996 album by Marcos Llunas
- Vida, a 2002 album by Del Castillo
- Vida, a 2002 album by Santiago Feliú
- Vida, a 2003 album by Tazenda
- Vida, a 2010 album by Canserbero
- Vida, a 2010 album by Tito Rojas
- Vida (Draco Rosa album), 2013
- Vida (Fuego album), 2014
- Vida (Luis Fonsi album), 2019
- Vida (Ana Tijoux album), 2024
- La Vida, Ainhoa Arteta 2009

=== Songs ===
- "Vida" (Ricardo Arjona song), 2010
- "Vida" (Ricky Martin song), 2014
- "La Vida" (Henry Santos song), 2013
- "Vída", a 2011 song by Alexander Acha from La Vída Es... Amor Sincero
- "Vida", a 1980 song by Celia Cruz, Johnny Pacheco and Pete "El Conde" Rodríguez from Celia/Johnny/Pete
- "Vida", a 1983 song by Chico Buarque
- "Vida", a 2002 song by Del Castillo from Vida
- "Vida", a 1981 song by Gilberto Gil
- "Vida", a 2001 song by Julio Iglesias from Ao Meu Brasil
- "Vida", a 1994 song by La Mafia from Vida
- "Vida", a 2010 song by Marc Anthony from Iconos
- "Vida", a 2012 song by Max Herre from Hallo Welt!
- "Vida", a 1966 song by Ray Barretto from El Ray Criollo
- "Vida", a 1999 song by Rubén Blades from Tiempos
- "La Vida", song by Los Fabulosos Cadillacs Hola/Chau

== People ==
=== Given name ===
- Vida Anim (born 1983), Ghanaian sprinter
- Vida Beselienė (born 1956), Lithuanian basketball player
- Vida Blue (1949–2023), American baseball player
- Vida Brest (1925–1985), Slovenian writer
- Vida Jane Butler (1923–2007), American radio pioneer
- Vida Chenoweth (1929–2018), American solo classical marimbist, ethnomusicologist and linguist
- Vida Marija Čigriejienė (born 1936), Lithuanian physician, politician and professor
- Vida Ghahremani (1936–2018), Iranian actress, designer and teacher
- Vida Goldstein (1869–1949), Australian feminist
- Vida Guerra (born 1974), Cuban-born glamour model
- Vida Halimian (born 1988), Iranian archer
- Vida Hope (1918–1963), British film actress
- Vida Jeraj Hribar (1902–2002), Slovenian violinist
- Vida Jeraj (1860–1932), Slovenian poet and lyricist
- Vida Jerman (1939–2011), Croatian actress
- Vida Mohammad (born 1997), Afghan model
- Vida Nsiah (born 1976), Ghanaian sprinter and hurdler
- Vida Ognjenović (born 1941), Serbian theater director, playwright and diplomat
- Vida Petrović-Škero (born 1955), Serbian Supreme Court judge
- Vida Samadzai (born 1978), Miss Afghanistan 2003
- Vida Dutton Scudder (1861–1954), American educator and welfare activist
- Vida Steinert, (1903 or 1905–1976), New Zealand painter
- Vida Vencienė (born 1961), Lithuanian cross-country skier
- Vida de Voss, Namibian feminist activist

=== Surname ===
- André Vida (born 1974), American musician
- Domagoj Vida (born 1989), Croatian association football player
- Francesco Vida (1903–1984), Italian military officer and skier
- Gheza Vida (1913–1980), Romanian-Hungarian sculptor
- Ginny Vida (born 1939), American editor and community leader
- Giorgio Levi Della Vida (1886–1967), Italian Jewish linguist
- José Vida Soria (1937–2019), Spanish jurist and politician
- József Vida (born 1963), Hungarian hammer thrower
- Katie Vida, American interdisciplinary artist
- Marco Girolamo Vida (c. 1485–1566), Italian humanist, bishop, and poet
- Péter Vida (born 1983), German politician
- Piero Vida (1938–1987), Italian film actor
- Rudika Vida, Croatian footballer
- Szabolcs Vida, Hungarian motorcycle speedway rider
- Vendela Vida (born 1971), American writer
- Viktor Vida (1913–1960), Croatian writer

== Other uses ==
- Vida (trade union), Austrian trade union
- Vida AB, Swedish sawmill company
- Club Deportivo y Social Vida, football team from Honduras
- VAT in the Digital Age, EU VAT reform
- Vida EV, a subsidiary of Hero MotoCorp

== See also ==
- Queen Vida
- Vida "V" Rocca, character from Power Rangers Mystic Force
- Vida, the title character in the show Vida the Vet
- Vidas, human given name or surname
