= La hija del mariachi =

La hija del mariachi may refer to either of two Colombian telenovelas:

- La hija del mariachi (2006 TV series), produced and aired by RCN Televisión
- La hija del mariachi (2025 TV series), remake of the 2006 telenovela. Also produced and aired by RCN Televisión.
