= He, She and It =

1991 novel by Marge Piercy

- Author: Marge Piercy
- Language: English
- Genre: Cyberpunk
- Published: 1991
- Publisher: Alfred A. Knopf
- Publication place: United States
- Media type: Print
- Pages: 448
- ISBN: 0-679-40408-2

He, She, and It (retitled Body of Glass in the United Kingdom) is a 1991 cyberpunk novel by American writer Marge Piercy. It won the Arthur C. Clarke Award for Best Science Fiction Novel in 1993. The novel, set in a post-apocalyptic America, follows a romance between a human woman and a cyborg created to protect her community from corporate raiders. The novel also interweaves a secondary narrative of the creation of a golem in 17th century Prague. Like Piercy's earlier novel Woman on the Edge of Time (1976), He, She, and It also examines themes such as gender roles, political economy, and environmentalism. In the mid-twenty-first century, Norika (formerly North America) is a toxic wasteland. Dominated by powerful corporations known as "multis", the region includes environmental domes, independent "free towns", and the chaotic "Glop", where most Norikans live in violent, polluted conditions ruled by gangs and warlords.

== Plot summary ==
The story of He, She and It takes place in North America in the year 2059. The economic and political power is held by a few multis—huge multinational enterprises with their own social hierarchies, that are able to produce an affluent society. However, the main part of the population lives in the glop (megalopolis) outside of the multis' enclaves within an environment that has mainly been destroyed. There, life is dominated by poverty, gang wars, and the law of the strongest. An exception to this is the so-called free towns that are able to sell their technologies to the multis but remain autonomous. Communication is handled via a network that allows the participants to project themselves into Cyberspace.

When the protagonist, Shira, loses custody of her son Ari to her ex-husband Josh, she returns from her multi, Yakamura-Stichen (Y-S), to her hometown Tikva (Hope in Hebrew) - a Jewish freetown. There, she starts working on the socialisation of the cyborg Yod (the tenth letter in Hebrew and a symbol for God in Kabbalah), who has been created illegally by Avram to protect the city. Yod is the tenth cyborg (a robot with human appearance and programmed human characteristics) in a row of previously failed experiments whose programming has partially been completed by Malkah, Shira's grandmother. Shira and Yod build up a (sexual) relationship between them and Shira's childhood sweetheart Gadi, Avram's son, also comes back to Tikva, due to his banishment for sleeping with a young girl. During the time when Malkah is working on a chimaera (security software) to protect the city from an online attack, she is attacked by Y-S, but Yod is able to stop the attack.

Eventually, Y-S invites Shira to a new custody hearing for her son. Shira, newly reunited with her mother, Riva, attends the hearing at a communications blackout spot, accompanied by Yod, Riva, and Nili (a biotechnologically enhanced woman from nuclear-devastated Israel), attends. The situation escalates into violence, resulting in casualties among the Y-S delegation and Riva. In response, Shira, Malkah, and Yod decide to infiltrate the Y-S network base successfully, obtaining personnel files that unveil a conspiracy against Shira and Tikva.

In the next phase, Shira, Yod, Nili, and Gadi enter the Glop, connecting with an underground group where they discover Riva alive and involved in resistance activities. Venturing into the Y-S enclave in Nebraska, they aim to kidnap Ari, resulting in Yod killing Josh. Back in Tikva, Shira's family experiences a brief respite before Y-S invites them to a net meeting, demanding Yod for its technology. Avram agrees, hoping to create another cyborg, but Yod ensures that his self-destruction causes a simultaneous explosion in Avram's lab. Avram perishes, and with his notes destroyed, the creation of another cyborg becomes impossible.

Finally, Malkah leaves Tikva with Nili to visit a secret town in post-nuclear holocaust Israel and to profit from the possible biotechnological enhancements. Shira is integrated into Tikva's society further. When she discovers copies of the notes concerning Yod, she initially plans on recreating Yod, but ultimately she respects his wishes and destroys them.

The main plot is interwoven with a story Malkah tells Yod that deals with Rabbi Judah Loew who Malkah depicts as her ancestor living in the ghetto of Prague around 1600. To protect the Jewish community from the Christian mob, Loew uses the knowledge of Kabbalah to create the golem Joseph from clay. His granddaughter Chava, a highly educated woman, teaches Joseph to read and write. Joseph successfully protects the ghetto and begins to think of himself as human and makes a plea for his right to a human existence. However, when the pogrom climate calms down, Loew returns Joseph to clay. The two stories are mutually illuminating, both asking what it means to be human, both from the perspective of man-made life, and that of those who love artificial lives.

== Sources ==
- Ruth Bienstock Anolik (2001) "Appropriating the Golem, Possessing the Dybbuk: Female Retellings of Jewish Tales", IN Mica Howe & Sarah Appleton Aguiar (editors), He Said, She Says: An RSVP to the Male Text. Madison, NJ; London, England: Fairleigh Dickinson UP; Associated UP; 2001. 292 pp.
- Marleen S. Barr (1993) Lost in Space: Probing Feminist Science Fiction and Beyond, Chapel Hill, NC: University of North Carolina Press, 1993.
- Keith M. Booker (1994) "Woman on the Edge of a Genre: The Feminist Dystopias of Marge Piercy", Science-Fiction Studies v.21, n.3, pp. 337–350 (Nov. 1994).
- Bronwen Calvert (2005) "Cyborg Utopia in Marge Piercy's Body of Glass", Foundation: The International Review of Science Fiction, v.34, n.95, pp. 52–61 (Autumn 2005).
- June Deery (1994), "Ectopic and Utopic reproduction: He, She and It", Utopian Studies, v.5, n.2, pp. 36–49 (1994).
- June Deery (2000) "The Biopolitics of Cyberspace: Piercy Hacks Gibson" pp. 87–108 IN: Marleen S. Barr, editor, Future Females, The Next Generation: New Voices and Velocities in Feminist Science Fiction Criticism. Lanham, MD: Rowman & Littlefield; 2000. xi, 323 pp.
- Eleonora Federici (1997) "The Ecriture Féminine of a 'Hideous Progeny': Marge Piercy's He, She and It as a Postmodern Intertext of Mary Shelley's Frankenstein", Versus: Quaderni di Studi Semiotici, v.77-78, pp. 119–143 (May-Dec 1997).
- William S. Haney, "Cyborg Revelation: Marge Piercy's He, She and It", chapter 9 of "Cyberculture, Cyborgs and Science Fiction: Consciousness and the Posthuman (Rodopi 2006, ISBN 90-420-1948-4)
- Joan Haran (2000) "(Re)Productive Fictions: Reproduction, Embodiment and Feminist Science in Marge Piercy's Science Fiction" pp. 154–68 IN: Karen Sayer & John Moore (editors), Science Fiction, Critical Frontiers. Basingstoke, England; New York, NY: Macmillan; St. Martin's; 2000. xiii, 219 pp.
- Elyce Rae Helford (2001) "The Future of Political Community: Race, Ethnicity, and Class Privilege in Novels by Piercy, Gomez, and Misha", Utopian Studies: Journal of the Society for Utopian Studies, v.12, n.2, pp. 124–42 (2001).
- Heather Hicks (2002) "Striking Cyborgs: Reworking the 'Human' in Marge Piercy's He, She and It pp. 85-106 IN: Mary Flanagan & Austin Booth (editors), Reload: Rethinking Women and Cyberculture. Cambridge, MA: MIT Press; 2002. xiv, 581 pp.
- Helen A. Kuryllo (1994) "Cyborgs, Sorcery, and the Struggle for Utopia", Utopian Studies, v.5, n.2, pp. 50–55 (1994).
- Dunja M. Mohr (2002) "'We're All Cyborgs': Cyberfeminism and the Cyborg as the Transgressive Metaphor of the Future in Marge Piercy's Body of Glass", pp. 306–18 IN: Ursula Pasero and Anja Gottburgsen, Wie Natürlich ist Geschlecht?: Gender und die Konstrucktion von Natur und Technik. Wiesbaden, Germany: Westdeutscher; 2002. 333 pp.
- Dunja M. Mohr (2004) "Cyborg and Cyb(hu)man: The Fine Line of Difference", pp. 120–33 IN: Helene Von Oldenburg and Andrea Sick (editors), Virtual Minds: Congress of Fictitious Figures. Bremen, Germany: Thealit; 2004. 235 pp.
- Vara Neverow, "The Politics of Incorporation and Embodiment: Woman on the Edge of Time and He, She and It as Feminist Epistemologies of Resistance", Utopian Studies, v.5, n.2, pp. 16–35 (1994).
- Marge Piercy, "Telling Stories About Stories", Utopian Studies, v.5, n.2, pp. 1–3 (1994).
- Diane Sautter (1996) "Erotic and Existential Paradoxes of the Golem: Marge Piercy's He, She and It", Journal of the Fantastic in the Arts, v.7, n.2-3 [nos.26-27], pp. 255–68 (1996).
- Anca Vlasopolos (1998) "Technology as Eros's Dart: Cyborgs as Perfect (Male?) Lovers", Foundation: The International Review of Science Fiction v.73, pp. 59–66 (Summer 1998).
- Jenny Wolmark (1994) Aliens and Others: Science Fiction, Feminism, and Postmodernism. London: Harester Wheatsheaf, 1993; Iowa City: University of Iowa Press, 1994.
