= Vidaković =

Vidaković (Serbian Cyrillic: Видаковић) is a South Slavic surname derived from Vidak and Vida family names. It is associated with Serbs, Croats, Bunjevci and Montenegrins ethnic groups and is commonly found in present-day Bosnia and Herzegovina, Croatia and Serbia.

It may refer to the following people:

- Albe Vidaković (1914–1964) Croatian composer, catholic priest and musicologist
- Mirko Vidaković (1924–2002), Croatian botanist
- Risto Vidaković (born 1969), Serbian footballer and manager
- Igor Vidaković (born 1983), Croatian footballer
- Nemanja Vidaković (born 1985), Serbian footballer
- Milovan Vidaković (1780–1841), Serbian novelist
- Branislav (Branko, Bane) Vidaković (born 1959) Serbian actor
- Neven Vidaković (1980.) Croatian scientist and financial expert
- Bruno Vidaković (1982.) Croatian scientist and physician

== See also ==
- Vida (disambiguation)
- Vidak
