= Vidas cruzadas =

Vidas cruzadas may refer to:

- Vidas cruzadas (1963 TV series), a Mexican telenovela
- Vidas Cruzadas (webnovela), a 2009 series on Univision.com
  - List of Vidas Cruzadas episodes
- Vidas cruzadas, a 1929 play by Jacinto Benavente
