= Vida Arena =

Multi-purpose arena in Växjö, Sweden

VIDA Arena
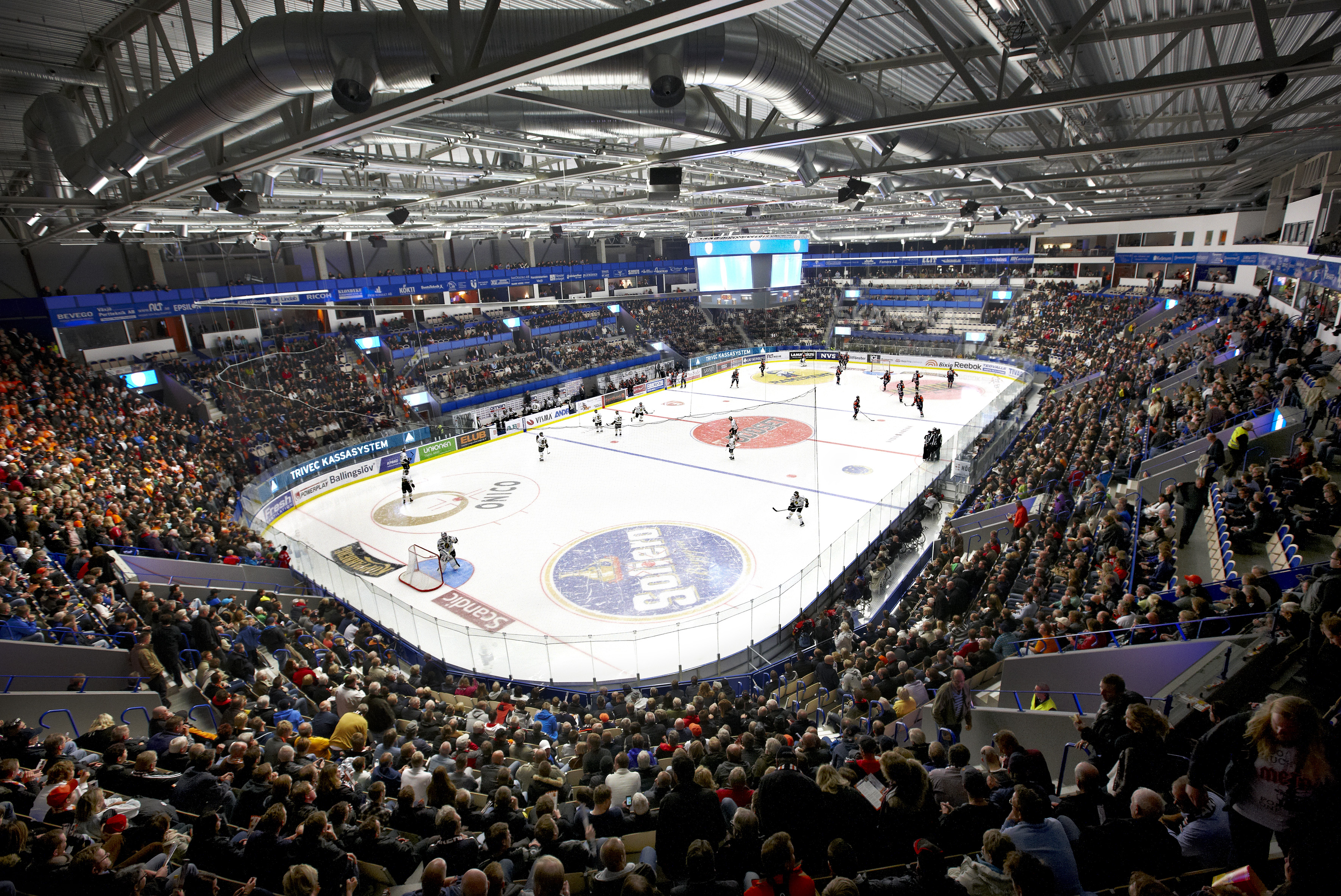
- Interactive map of VIDA Arena
- Location: Växjö, Sweden
- Coordinates: 56°52′47″N 14°46′25″E
- Owner: Växjö Lakers
- Capacity: Ice hockey: 5,750

Construction
- Groundbreaking: September 2010; 16 years ago
- Opened: 7 September 2011; 14 years ago

Tenant
- Växjö Lakers (SHL) (2011–present)

Vida Arena (branded as VIDA Arena) is a multi-purpose indoor arena located in Växjö, Sweden. The arena opened in September 2011 and is best known as the home arena for the ice hockey team Växjö Lakers. It seats 5,750 spectators.

== Construction ==
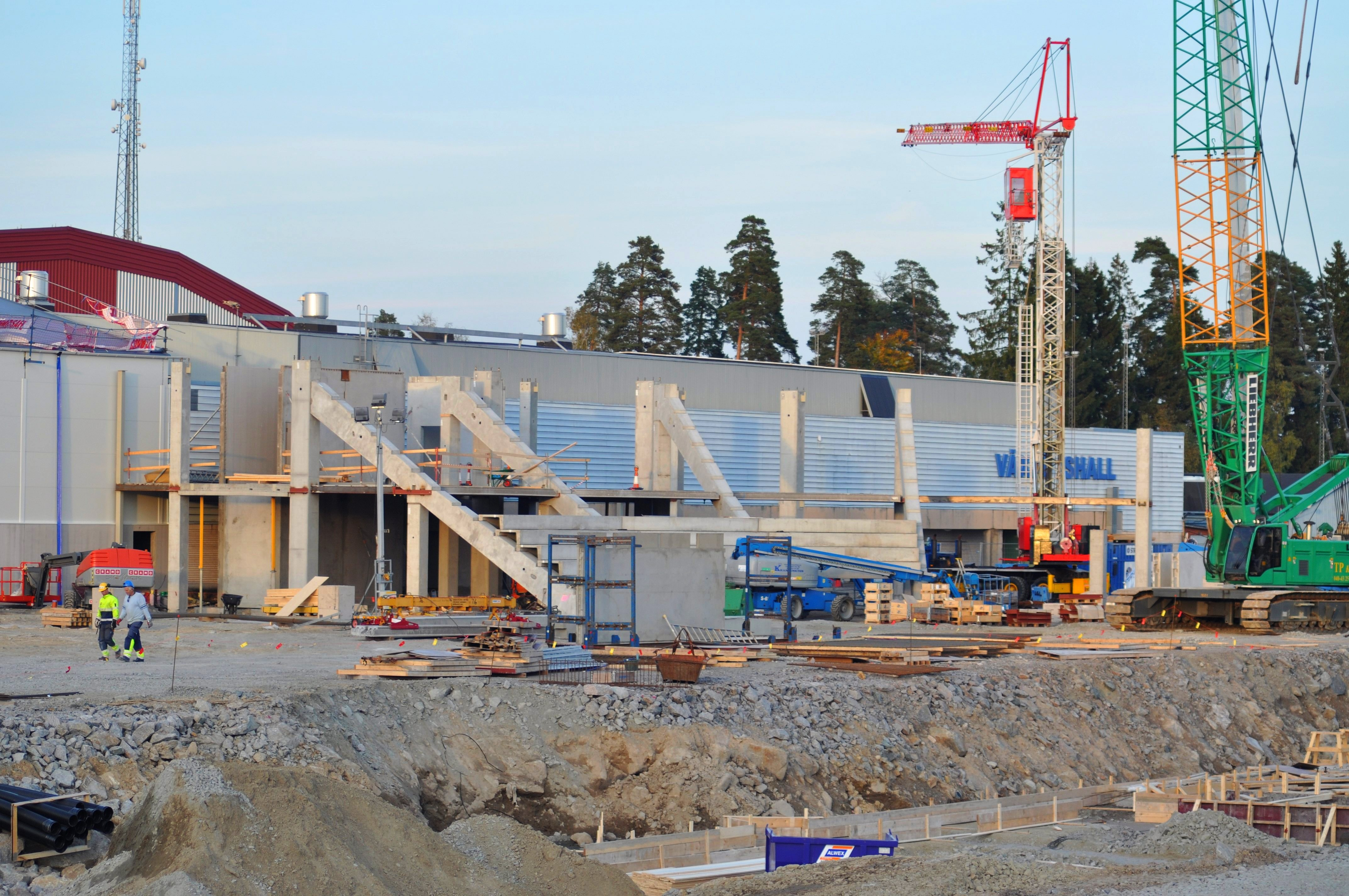
The construction of Vida Arena started in September 2010.

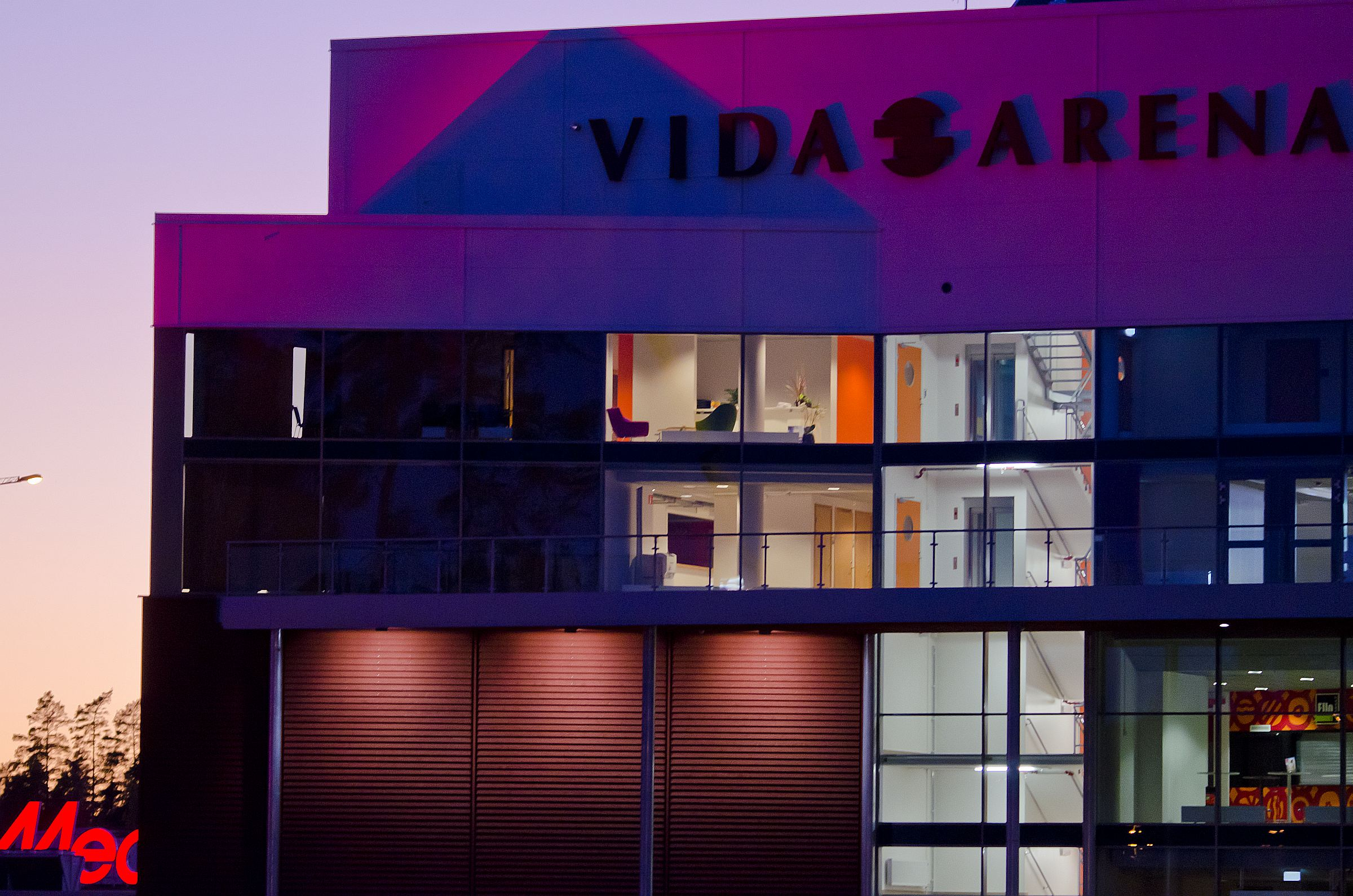
Vida Arena's west part of the front exterior.

The construction of Vida Arena began in September 2010 and was finished in summer 2011, in time for the Växjö Lakers' debut season in the Elitserien (now named the SHL), the top-tier ice hockey league in Sweden. Although mainly intended to be used for ice hockey, Vida Arena is also used for other events such as concerts and news conferences. The arena is named after the Vida Group, the company that acquired the naming rights for Vida Arena in September 2010, for the upcoming 14 seasons (expiring after the 2023–24 season).

== Spectator capacity ==
As of the 2019–20 season, Vida Arena is the SHL's newest arena and has a spectator capacity of 5,750, making it the SHL's capacity-wise fourth-smallest arena.

For the entire 2011–12 season, the arena had a capacity of 5,329 spectators. Plans were announced to extend the capacity to at least 6,000. Prior to the beginning of the 2012–13 season, the capacity was increased to 5,800 spectators. In October 2012, however, the capacity was slightly reduced to 5,700 due to concerns from spectators. Level 4 was mainly affected.

== Inauguration ==
The arena was officially inaugurated on 17 September 2011, in an ice hockey game between Växjö Lakers and Linköpings HC. The arena tickets for the game were outsold within just one hour, with the Lakers' marketing manager speculating that they could have sold out two arenas. Former Växjö Lakers crowd favorite Shjon Podein watched the game live in the arena. Linköping won the game 4–2 in front of 5,502 spectators. However, the Lakers' premier game on 13 September, on away ice against Frölunda HC, was shown on the Vida Arena's Jumbotron in front of 2,400 spectators, with free entrance, as a preview of the Vida Arena experience and a test of the arena's technical features. Frölunda won the game 2–0.

== Arenastaden ==
Vida Arena is part of the sports complex Arenastaden ("the Arena city"), which also includes a new football stadium, a floorball arena, and an arena for athletics. Vida Arena is connected with Växjö Ishall, an old arena inaugurated in 1970 which, since a renovation which took place in 2006, has a capacity of 4,000 spectators.

== Other events ==
Vida Arena hosted the first semifinal of Melodifestivalen 2012 on 4 February 2012. This was the third time that Växjö hosted a Melodifestivalen stage, after 2002 and 2005 (both times in Tipshallen). The venue also hosted the third heat of Melodifestivalen 2024.

== Sans Cash ==
Vida Arena is the first cashless arena in Sweden.

== Panorama image ==
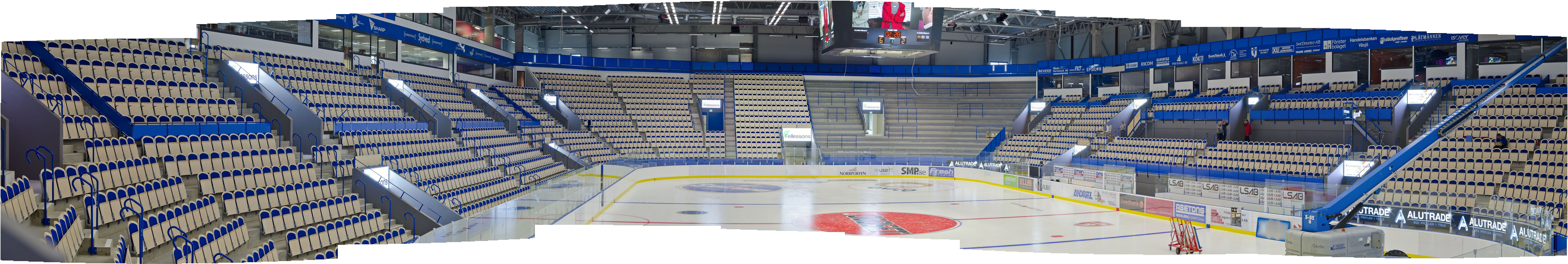

== See also ==
- List of indoor arenas in Sweden
- List of indoor arenas in Nordic countries
