= Going Down Fast =

- Author: Marge Piercy
- Language: English
- Publisher: Trident Press
- Publication date: 1969
- ISBN: 0-671-27040-0 (first edition)
- Dewey Decimal: 813.54
- LC Class: PZ4.P618 Go

Going Down Fast (ISBN 0-449-24480-6) is a 1969 novel by Marge Piercy. It tells the story of Anna, a woman living with multiple losses; Rowley, a blue-eyed soul singer; Leon, an underground film-maker; and Caroline, a woman with a dark secret. They all live in an area of an unnamed city where a swathe of blocks are being demolished to make way for a university.

== Reception ==
A New York Times book review said that "Piercy burns anger and conviction".
