= Vidak =

Vidak (Cyrillic script: Видак) is a South Slavic masculine given name. Notable people with the name include:

- Vidak Bratić, Serbian footballer
- Andy Vidak, American politician
- Marijeta Vidak, Croatian handball player

== See also ==
- Vidaković
