= Joaquín Garrido =

Mexican actor

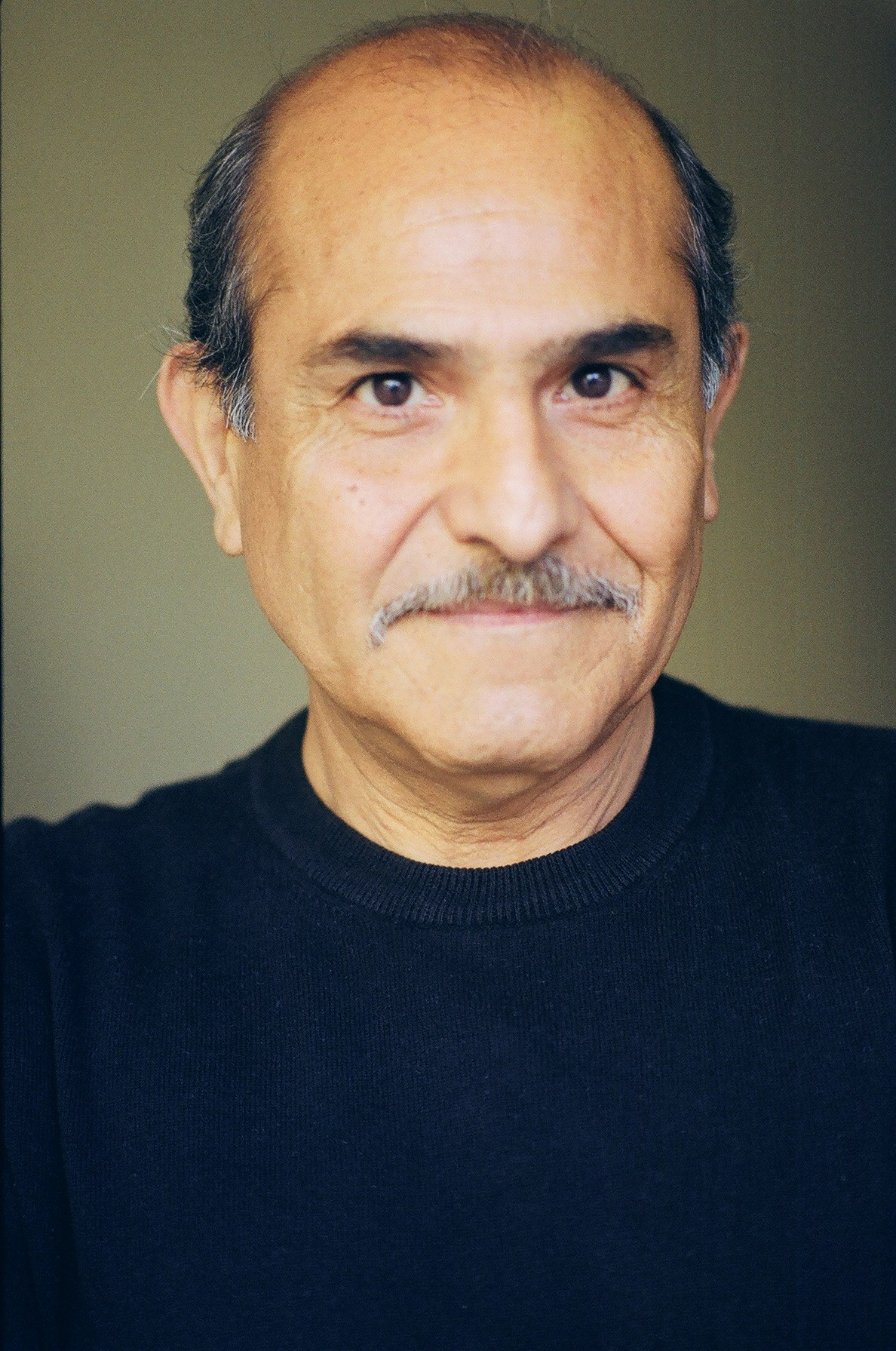
- Born: 17 May 1952 (age 74); Mexico City, Distrito Federal, Mexico
- Occupation: Actor
- Years active: 1986-present

Joaquín Garrido (born 17 May 1952) is a Mexican actor.

== Filmography ==
=== Films ===
Year	Title	Role	Notes
1986	Chido Guan, el tacos de oro	Javier	
1986	El hijo del viento		
1987	Un día crucial para Ausencio Paredes		
1987	Macho y hembras		
1988	El sótano		Short film
1988	El cielo subterráneo		
1988	Cumpleaños feliz		Short film
1989	Romero	Presidential aide	
1990	Las buenas costumbres	Hernán Salas	
1990	Crimen imposible		
1991	Mujer de cabaret		
1991	No quiero discutir	Doctor	Short film
1991	¡Mátenme porque me muero!	Notario	
1991	Corrupción y placer		
1991	Como agua para chocolate	Sargento Treviño	
1992	Beltrán		Short film
1992	Cómodas mensualidades		
1994	The Cisco Kid	Lopez	Television film
1994	Estación ardiente	Joao	Television film
1994	La hija del Puma	El Capitán	
1995	Crimen perfecto		
1995	Viva San Isidro	Etziquio Estevez	Short film
1996	Félix, como el gato		
1996	Solo, el destructor	Vasquez	
2002	Escalera al cielo		Short film
2002	La maceta		Short film
2003	The Ticket	The Ticket	Short film
2003	Taco Bender	José	Short film
2003	Ladies' Night	Presentador	
2004	A Day Without a Mexican	José Mendoza	
2004	Demon Slayer	Father Enrique	Video
2006	Paso de ovejas	Father Damian	Short film
2008	El último evangelio	Enviado del Vaticano	
2009	Territorio prohibido	Juan's Grandfather	
2009	La línea	Taxi Driver	
2010	Los chicos están bien	Luis	
2010	La niña del desierto	Javier	Short film
2010	In the Drink	Jose	Short film
2012	Mosquita y Mari	Mr. Olveros	
2012	Cristiada	Minister Amaro	

=== Television ===
Year	Title	Role	Notes
1990	Cenizas y diamantes	Garnica	
1991	Vida robada	Cuco	
1993	Acapulco H.E.A.T.	Mustafa	"Code Name: Honeymoon Lost" (Season 1, Episode 3)
1993	Valentina	Enrique	
1994	Y sin embargo, se mueve		
1996	Nada personal	X	
1999	Cuentos para solitarios	Gabriel	"Siete cruces en un campo santo" (Season 2, Episode 12)
2000	Todo por amor	Andrés	
2002	La Virgen de Guadalupe	Fray Tadeo	TV mini-series
2003	The Shield	Mexican Border Officer	"The Quick Fix" (Season 2, Episode 1)
2003	Dragnet	Angel Grande	"The Little Guy" (Season 1, Episode 12)
2003	Amor descarado	Eliodoro Galdames	
2004	Zapata: Amor en rebeldía	Efraín Huerta	TV mini-series
2005	La ley del silencio	Pedro	4 episodes
2005	Joey	Officiant	"Joey and the Tijuana Trip" (Season 2, Episode 12) "Joey and the Christmas Party" (Season 2, Episode 13)
2006	My Name Is Earl	Elderly Man	"South of the Border: Part Dos" (Season 2, Episode 11)
2007	Monk	Raul	"Mr. Monk Visits a Farm" (Season 5, Episode 15)
2009	Vidas cruzadas	José	
2010	Capadocia	Padre Nicolás Valtierra	"Cordero de dios" (Season 2, Episode 2) "Bienaventurados los inocentes" (Season 2, Episode 6)
2011	El encanto del águila	General Bernardo Reyes	"La traición de los Herejes" (Season 1, Episode 4)
2012	Infames	Leopoldo Rivas	
2013	La Patrona	Aníbal Villegas	
2014	Camelia la Texana	Arnulfo Navarro	
2014-2015	Tierra de reyes	Don Felipe Belmonte	
