= Marge Piercy =

American novelist and poet (born 1936)

- Born: March 31, 1936 (age 90); Detroit, Michigan, U.S.
- Education: University of Michigan (BA); Northwestern University (MA)
- Occupation: Writer
- Spouse: Ira Wood (m. 1982)
- Website: margepiercy.com

Marge Piercy (born March 31, 1936) is an American writer. Her work includes Woman on the Edge of Time; He, She and It, which won the 1993 Arthur C. Clarke Award; and Gone to Soldiers, a New York Times Best Seller and a sweeping historical novel set during World War II. Piercy's work is rooted in her Jewish heritage, Marxist social and political activism, and feminist ideals.

== Life ==
=== Family and her early life ===
Marge Piercy was born in Detroit, Michigan, to Bert Piercy and Robert Piercy. While her father was non-religious from a Presbyterian background, she was raised Jewish by her mother and her Orthodox Jewish maternal grandmother, who gave Piercy the Hebrew name of Marah.

On her childhood and Jewish identity, Piercy said: "Jews and blacks were always lumped together when I grew up. I didn’t grow up 'white.' Jews weren't white. My first boyfriend was black. I didn't find out I was white until we spent time in Baltimore and I went to a segregated high school. I can't express how weird it was. Then I just figured they didn't know I was Jewish."

An indifferent student in her early childhood, Piercy developed a love of books when she came down with the German measles and rheumatic fever in her mid-childhood and could do little but read. "It taught me that there's a different world there, that there were all these horizons that were quite different from what I could see".

=== Education ===
Upon graduation from Mackenzie High School, Piercy became the first in her family to attend college, studying at the University of Michigan, where she received a B.A. degree in 1957. Winning a Hopwood Award for Poetry and Fiction (1957) enabled her to finish college and spend some time in France. She earned an M.A. degree from Northwestern University in 1958.

=== Adulthood ===
After graduating from college, Piercy and her first husband went to France, then returned to the United States. They divorced when Piercy was 23. Living in Chicago, she supported herself working various part-time jobs while unsuccessfully trying to get her novels published. It was during this time that Piercy realized she wanted to write fiction that focused on politics, feminism, and working-class people. After her second marriage, she became involved in the organization Students for a Democratic Society. In 1968, Piercy's first book of poetry, Breaking Camp, was published, and her first novel was accepted for publication that same year.

=== Personal life and relationships ===
At a young age, Piercy was married to her first husband, a French Jewish physicist. However, the marriage failed when she was 23; Piercy attributes this to his expectations of gender roles in marriage. In 1962, she married her second husband, Robert Shapiro, a computer scientist. They divorced, and Piercy married her current husband, Ira Wood. She and her husband live in Wellfleet, MA. Piercy designed their home, where the couple have been living since the 1970s. She runs Leapfrog Press with her novelist husband.

== Politics ==
Piercy was involved in the civil rights movement, New Left, and Students for a Democratic Society. She is a feminist, environmentalist, Marxist, socialist, and anti-war activist.

In 1977, Piercy became an associate of the Women's Institute for Freedom of the Press (WIFP), an American nonprofit publishing organization that works to increase communication between women and connect the public with forms of women-based media.

In 2013, Piercy signed an open letter, described as an "open statement from 48 radical feminists from seven countries". The letter may be interpreted to endorse TERF ideology because it defends the right to exclude transgender women from "women-only conferences". In 2024, however, she wrote on her blog explicitly supporting trans people. "I can’t understand the anger at trans people and LGBTQ etc in general.... Why shouldn’t someone decide they’ve been assigned the wrong gender? What business is it of governments?".

== Writing ==
Piercy is the author of more than seventeen volumes of poems, among them The Moon Is Always Female (1980, considered a feminist classic) and The Art of Blessing the Day (1999). She has published fifteen novels, one play (The Last White Class, co-authored with her current—and third—husband Ira Wood), one collection of essays (Parti-colored Blocks for a Quilt), one non-fiction book, and one memoir. She contributed the pieces "The Grand Coolie Damn" and "Song of the Fucked Duck" to the celebrated 1970 anthology Sisterhood Is Powerful: An Anthology of Writings from The Women's Liberation Movement, edited by Robin Morgan.

Piercy's novels and poetry often focus on feminist or social concerns, although her settings vary. While Body of Glass (published in the United States as He, She and It) is a science fiction novel that won the Arthur C. Clarke Award, City of Darkness, City of Light was set during the French Revolution. Other novels, such as Summer People and The Longings of Women, are set during modern times. All of her books share a focus on women's lives.

Woman on the Edge of Time (1976) mixes a time travel story with issues of social justice, feminism, and the treatment of the mentally ill. This novel is considered a classic of utopian "speculative" science fiction as well as a feminist classic. William Gibson has credited Woman on the Edge of Time as the birthplace of Cyberpunk, as Piercy mentions in an introduction to Body of Glass. Body of Glass (He, She and It, 1991) itself postulates an environmentally ruined world dominated by sprawling mega-cities and a futuristic version of the Internet, through which Piercy weaves elements of Jewish mysticism and the legend of the Golem, although a key story element is the main character's attempts to regain custody of her young son.

Many of Piercy's novels tell their stories from the viewpoints of multiple characters, often including a first-person voice among numerous third-person narratives. Her World War II historical novel, Gone to Soldiers (1987) follows the lives of nine major characters in the United States, Europe and Asia. The first-person account in Gone to Soldiers is the diary of French teenager Jacqueline Levy-Monot, who is also followed in the third person after her capture by the Nazis.

Piercy's poetry tends to be highly personal free verse and often centered on feminist and social issues. Her work shows commitment to social change—what she might call, in Judaic terms, tikkun olam, or the repair of the world. It is rooted in story, the wheel of the Jewish year, and a range of landscapes and settings.

Piercy contributed poems to the journal Kalliope: A Journal of Women's Art and Literature and Earth's Daughters. Piercy also contributed to the collection of essays by women leaders in the climate movement, All We Can Save.

== Works ==
=== Novels ===
- Going Down Fast, 1969
- Dance The Eagle To Sleep, 1970
- Small Changes, 1973
- Woman on the Edge of Time, 1976
- The High Cost of Living, 1978
- Vida, 1979
- Braided Lives, 1982
- Fly Away Home, 1985
- Gone To Soldiers, 1987
- Summer People, 1989
- He, She And It (aka Body of Glass), 1991
- The Longings of Women, 1994
- City of Darkness, City of Light, 1996
- Storm Tide, 1998 (with Ira Wood)
- Three Women, 1999
- The Third Child, 2003
- Sex Wars, 2005

=== Short stories ===
- The Cost of Lunch, Etc., 2014

=== Poetry collections ===
- Breaking Camp, 1968
- Hard Loving, 1969
- "Barbie Doll", 1973
- 4-Telling (with Emmett Jarrett, Dick Lourie, Robert Hershon), 1971
- To Be of Use, 1973
- A Work of Artifice,1973
- Living in the Open, 1976
- The Twelve-Spoked Wheel Flashing, 1978
- The Moon is Always Female, 1980
- Circles on the Water: Selected Poems, 1982
- Stone, Paper, Knife, 1983
- My Mother's Body, 1985
- Available Light, 1988
- Early Ripening: American Women's Poetry Now (ed.), 1988; 1993
- Mars and Her Children, 1992
- What are Big Girls Made Of, 1997
- Early Grrrl, 1999.
- The Art of Blessing the Day: Poems With a Jewish Theme, 1999
- Colours Passing Through Us, 2003
- The Crooked Inheritance, 2006
- The Hunger Moon: New and Selected Poems, 1980–2010, 2012
- Made in Detroit, 2015
- On the Way Out, Turn Off the Light, 2020

=== Collected other ===
- "The Grand Coolie Damn" and "Song of the fucked duck" in Sisterhood is Powerful: An Anthology of Writings From The Women's Liberation Movement, 1970, edited by Robin Morgan
- The Last White Class (play co-authored with Ira Wood), 1979
- Parti-Colored Blocks For a Quilt (essays), 1982
- The Earth Shines Secretly: A book of Days (daybook calendar), 1990
- So You Want to Write (non-fiction), 2001
- Sleeping with Cats, (memoir), 2002
- My Life, My Body (Outspoken Authors) (essays, poems & memoir), 2015

== Awards and honors ==
- Arthur C. Clarke Award for science fiction, 1992
- Bradley Award, New England Poetry Club, 1992
- Brit ha-Dorot Award, Shalom Center, 1992
- May Sarton Award, New England Poetry Club, 1991
- Golden Rose Poetry Prize, New England Poetry Club, 1990
- Carolyn Kizer Poetry Prize, 1986, 1990
- National Endowment for the Arts award, 1978
- Honorary Doctor of Humane Letters degree from the Hebrew Union College, Cincinnati, Ohio, 2004
