= Vidas =

Vidas may refer to:

== People ==
- Vidas Alunderis (born 1979), Lithuanian footballer
- Vidas Bičiulaitis (born 1971), Lithuanian boxer
- Vidas Blekaitis (born 1972), Lithuanian strongman
- Vidas Dančenka (born 1973), Lithuanian football player
- Vidas Ginevičius (born 1978), Lithuanian professional basketball point guard
- Vidas Kupčinskas (born 1971), Lithuanian sprint canoer
- Vidas Mikalauskas (born 1955), Lithuanian politician representing the Social Democratic Party
- Eliyahu de Vidas (1518–1592), 16th-century rabbi in Ottoman Palestine

== See also ==
- Vida (Occitan literary form)
- Vidas cruzadas (disambiguation)
