= Sofía Lama =

Mexican actress of Greek descent (born 1987)

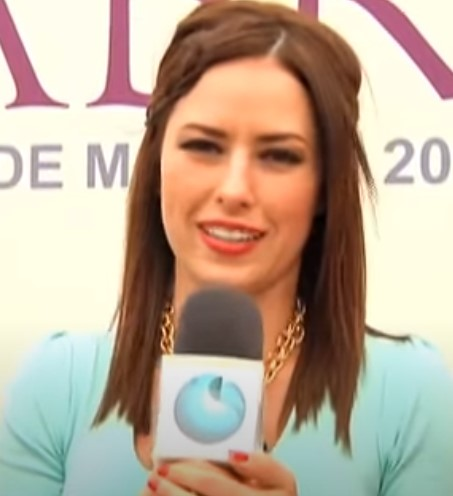
- Lama in 2014
- Born: Sofía Lama Stamatiades; 9 June 1987 (age 37); Puebla, Mexico
- Occupation: Actress
- Years active: 1993–present

Sofía Lama (Spanish pronunciation: [soˈfi.a (e)sˈtamaˈtjaðes]; born Sofía Lama Stamatiades on June 9, 1987, in Puebla, Mexico) is a Mexican actress of Greek descent.

== Life ==
Sofia Lama was born in Puebla, Mexico, a state in the center of Mexico. She started acting at the age of 11 and was the star of several TV shows for children including Disney Club with Disney Channel Mexico.

At the age of 18 Sofia moved to Mexico City. She starred in the musical "Grease" playing "Frenchie" and toured successfully throughout Mexico. She continued her passion for theater and had lead roles in several plays in Mexico City such as "Las Arpias" & "El ultimo Aliento". Sofia also studied film for 3 years at the Estudios Cinematograficos INIDI. She took acting classes with Adriana Barraza (Oscar nominated for BABEL) and studied with Juan Carlos Corazza (Spain).

Sofia worked consistently in Mexican television before getting the opportunity to travel to Miami and begin her career in the U.S. Hispanic Market.

With now over 12 Series Regular credits under her belt, Sofia has become one of the most well known faces in both Latin America and the U.S. Hispanic Market. Her series with NBC Universal/Telemundo include Pecados ajenos, Sin senos no hay paraíso, La casa de al lado & Dueños del paraíso (where she starred opposite Kate Del Castillo & Adriana Barraza) have aired in more than 100 countries worldwide and streamed on Netflix.

One of Sofia's most important roles was "Alicia Gonzalez" in the acclaimed and popular Univision series "Eva Luna". Its finale drew more than 9.1 million viewers in the U.S. and she became one of the most popular young actresses in the Latin Market.

Sofia had the lead role of "Fernanda" in the 2015 film "Desde El Mas Alla" which she also produced. The film was a critical success and toured in film festivals in Mexico. That same year she played 'Vanessa' in the romantic comedy "Enamorandome de Abril".

In 2016 she played "Elizabeth Cardenas", one of the series regulars on "Eva La Trailera" for NBC Universal/Telemundo.

In 2017 she will star in the Fox International/Telemexico series "Guerra De Idolos". The story revolves around the death of a regional Mexican music idol and showcases the lives of those who manage and control the Latin music business in the U.S.

== Filmography ==
Film roles
Year	Title	Roles	Notes
2010	Más sabe el diablo: El primer golpe	Young Esperanza Salvador	
2015	Enamorándome de Abril	Vanessa	
2017	Desde el más allá	Fernanda	

Television roles
Year	Title	Roles	Notes
1993	El peñón del amaranto	Child Amaranta	
2004	Soñarás	Huesitos	
2004	La vida es una canción	Marisol	3 episodes
2007	Lo que la gente cuenta	Unknown role	Episode: "La monja"
2007–2008	Pecados ajenos	Gloria Mercenario	163 episodes
2008	Decisiones	Nora	Episode: "Al ataque"
2008–2009	Sin senos no hay paraíso	Julieta Riva Palas	56 episodes
2009	Más sabe el diablo	Young Esperanza Salvador	Episode: "Sentencia divina"
2009	Vidas cruzadas	Lucy	
2010	Eva Luna	Alicia González	108 episodes
2011–2012	La casa de al lado	Hilda González	158 episodes
2012	Mia Mundo	Stef	Episode: "Listen to Your Heart"
2012–2013	Rosa diamante	Andrea Fernández	
2012	Lado B	Maya	Television film
2013	Descarri-lados	Ivonne	
2013	Dama y obrero	Mireya Gómez	
2015	Dueños del paraíso	Silvana Cardona	38 episodes
2016	Eva la trailera	Elizabeth "Betty" Cárdenas	68 episodes
2017	Guerra de ídolos	Gilda Solar	53 episodes
2017	Designated Survivor	Gloria Menez	Episode: "Equilibrium"
2018	Chicago P.D.	Marcella Gomez	Episode: "Chasing Monsters"
2018	NCIS: Los Angeles	Ella Juanega	Episode: "Asesinos"
2018	El secreto de Selena	María Celeste Arrarás	Main role
2019	Queen of the South	Emilia	4 episodes
2020-2021	100 días para enamorarnos	Aurora Villareal	72 episodes
2022-2023	La mujer del diablo	Patricia Alcántara	
2022-2023	La Reina del Sur	Susana Guzmán	
2025	La hija del mariachi	Guadalupe Morales	
