= Barbie Doll (poem) =

Poem by Marge Piercy

"Barbie Doll" is a narrative poem written by American writer, novelist, and social activist Marge Piercy. It was published in 1971, during the time of second-wave feminism. It is often noted for its message of how a patriarchal society puts expectations and pressures on women, partly through gender role stereotyping. It tells a story about a girl who dies trying to meet the unrealistic expectations that society holds for her. It starts off talking about a little girl, and then continues chronologically through the girl’s life. Using strong diction, purposeful syntax, and various rhetorical devices, the poem hits on prominent feminist issues such as gender stereotypes, sexism, and the effect of a patriarchal society.

== Background ==
Marge Piercy wrote this poem during an era of second wave feminism, a time in which women were concerned about sexuality, family, and the workplace. The poem expresses feminist anger at patriarchal influences that women were submitted to during the 1960s. Not only were women subjected to poor treatment because of their gender, women also experienced discrimination and unequal treatment because of their race. While this poem discusses the topic of gender and gender stereotypes, it is important to recognize that the development of the doll that inspired the poem has brought up the racial discrepancies woman faced during this time. According to Elizabeth Chin, “These toys were designed and marketed specifically to reshape a territory dominated by an assumption of whiteness, but paradoxically, they have integrated the toy world while at the same time fixing racial boundaries more firmly. Although not addressed in this poem, the racial discrepancies that arose after the creation of the Barbie Doll, such as "hair type, facial features, and skin color” have been addressed throughout the years. Therefore, the purpose of the poem was to display the struggle women faced because of these societal issues in hopes of changing them. The poem shows the idealist view that is created by the appearance of the doll that causes people to question social norms and expectations that seem to exist in society.

== Analysis ==
=== First stanza ===
The first stanza begins with a girl being born, fitting perfectly into a mold provided by the society she was born into. The stanza lists toys that any little girl might play with, such as dolls and miniature GE stoves and irons. She was also given lipstick, compared to cherry candy using a metaphor. In a patriarchal society, women hold the positions of cooking and cleaning in the household. This, along with the makeup she was given, shows that from a very young age this girl was taught to conform to a specific gender stereotype, without even realizing it. The doll is also an important part of this stanza, as well as the entire poem. The Barbie Doll has been a cultural icon since it was created in 1959, a little over 10 years before this poem was published. It is somewhat controversial whether it is viewed as a “role model for young girls, an icon of American culture, and a model of aesthetic perfection” or on the other hand “a tool of racism, classism, and sexism, and disparaged as a contemporary epitomization of the cult of thinness.” In the context of this poem, the Barbie Doll ends up being a negative aspect of the girl’s life, creating a poor self-body image among other problems. At the end of this stanza, the girl goes through puberty. Someone in the girl’s class commented negative things about her body, saying she had a large nose and fat thighs. This is the point in the poem at which her insecurities have been grounded. Throughout the rest of the poem, she grows up striving to meet unattainable societal standards that her Barbie doll represents.

=== Second stanza ===
The next stanza talks about the girl in terms of what attributes she held, but also how she and society did not see them. She was described as healthy, smart, strong, sexually able, and fast, yet she did not see any of these things. According to Robert Perrin, Barbie is described using "robust terms" throughout this stanza; however, she immediately apologizes for her positive attributes as if she was not good enough in the eyes of society. She had learned from the time when she was a just a child that she had imperfections and was not good enough. She compared herself to her doll, and therefore apologized to society for her imperfections. She did not see the good in herself, only the comparison between what she was and what society says she should be. In this stanza, her qualities are listed one after another, which is then followed by her disapproval. This syntax helps the reader see all of the good aspects of the girl all at once, which then makes the reader question why the girl does not see them. The stanza finishes with saying everyone, meaning society, only sees her for her fat nose and thick legs, the same thing she was told by her classmate when she was a child.

=== Third stanza ===
The third stanza talks about the sexist expectations that patriarchal society has placed upon her. As a girl, “she was advised to play coy, exhorted to come on hearty, exercise, diet, smile and wheedle.” This list shows the expectations that are placed upon women in society. The patriarchal power within the society is what is responsible for the belief of certain “standards” of women. Women are expected to play nice, come across as good girls, be skinny, eat little, and be happy all of the time. Because of external pressures, they try to do all of it. There is sexism represented in these lines because only women have lengthy expectations to meet. Piercy’s diction in this stanza “create[s] a powerful vision of the way people exert their influence on impressionable young women, as well as undermine young women who, at heart, want to resist the influences of the dominant culture.” The girl in the poem is easily influenced because she has conformed to society since she was a little girl. Because of this, she aims to meet all of these expectations, but cannot sustain them. She is worn down further and further “like a fan belt." and eventually kills herself trying to become as perfect as society wants her to be. She finally gave society her nose and legs because she could not live in this way anymore.

=== Fourth stanza ===
The fourth and final stanza talks about the girl’s death. She ultimately died trying to be as perfect as her Barbie Doll, a cookie cutter woman molded by society. She died trying to reach something that was unattainable, yet encouraged, which is where the real problem in lies. She was displayed in her casket, all dolled up. Society had finally made her who it wanted her to be but at the cost of her life. Now that she was covered in makeup, reconstructed, and nicely dressed, she was considered pretty. The stanza finishes with the line “to every woman a happy ending." This shows that in the end, this was all the girl wanted. She strove and strove to meet society’s unrealistic expectations and when she died trying, she finally did. Being viewed as pretty by society was her goal, and she accomplished it.

=== Conclusion ===
The girl in the poem was born in innocence and labeled "girlchild" but because of the society she was born and raised into, she became corrupted. This poem shows the sad case of a girl who lived trying to be perfect and died trying. From the very beginning she was taught to cook, clean, and be who she was “supposed” to be, or in other words, who society told her she was. Because of these sexist and patriarchal influences, she was never completely satisfied with herself. The tortures of society cost the girl her life.

== Other analyses of the poem ==
=== Barbie Doll’ and ‘G. I. Joe’: Exploring Issues of Gender ===
Robert Perrin uses his students to examine Marge Piercy's poem. " Perrin provides insight into how younger generations are affected by the stereotyping that is shown by the Barbie Doll itself. This journal gives an analysis on Marge Piercy's poem that can help the reader better understand her criticism.
