= List of Vidas Cruzadas episodes =

The following is an episode list for the Univision webnovela Vidas Cruzadas.

== Episodes ==
No.	Title	Directed by	Written by	U.S. release date	Prod. code
1	"Capitulo 1 (Episode 1)"	TBA	TBA	August 12, 2009	101
In the midst of a discussion, Daniel began his plan of conquest. Guest Stars:
2	"Capitulo 2 (Episode 2)"	TBA	TBA	August 14, 2009	102
Mariana has a close encounter with his destiny. Guest Stars:
3	"Capitulo 3 (Episode 3)"	TBA	TBA	August 17, 2009	103
Mariana was surprised and wanted to surprise. Guest Stars:
4	"Capitulo 4 (Episode 4)"	TBA	TBA	August 19, 2009	104
In the midst of a discussion, Daniel began his plan of conquest. Guest Stars:
5	"Capitulo 5 (Episode 5)"	TBA	TBA	August 21, 2009	105
The appointment of "work" between Daniel and Mariana implications. Guest Stars:
6	"Capitulo 6 (Episode 6)"	TBA	TBA	August 24, 2009	106
Burning passion between Daniel and Marian, but the threat a secret. Guest Stars:
7	"Capitulo 7 (Episode 7)"	TBA	TBA	August 26, 2009	107
Mariana does not know how to tell the truth to Daniel. Is it too late? Guest Stars:
8	"Capitulo 8 (Episode 8)"	TBA	TBA	August 28, 2009	108
The bomb exploded! Daniel discovered the truth and his reaction was swift. Guest Stars:
9	"Capitulo 9 (Episode 9)"	TBA	TBA	August 31, 2009	109
Mariana's Pregnancy by insemination is not accepted by everyone. Guest Stars:
10	"Capitulo 10 (Episode 10)"	TBA	TBA	September 2, 2009	110
Mariana went to tell the truth to Daniel and found a surprise. Guest Stars:
11	"Capitulo 11 (Episode 11)"	TBA	TBA	September 4, 2009	111
The truth came to light! Gloria revealed to Mariana the identity of her donor. Guest Stars:
12	"Capitulo 12 (Episode 12)"	TBA	TBA	September 7, 2009	112
When Mariana decides to rebuild her life without Daniel, he desperately seeks for her. Guest Stars:
13	"Capitulo 13 (Episode 13)"	TBA	TBA	September 9, 2009	113
Mariana can't forget Daniel while he gets closer and closer to finding her. Guest Stars:
14	"Capitulo 14 (Episode 14)"	TBA	TBA	September 11, 2009	114
Daniel discovers that Mariana child of his and seeks help to win her back. Guest Stars:
15	"Capitulo 15 (Episode 15)"	TBA	TBA	September 16, 2009	115
Guest Stars:
