= Woman on the Edge of Time =

1976 novel by Marge Piercy

- First edition
- Author: Marge Piercy
- Language: English
- Genre: Science fiction, utopian
- Publisher: Alfred A. Knopf
- Publication date: 1976
- Publication place: United States
- Media type: Print (hardback & paperback)
- Pages: 369
- ISBN: 0-394-49986-7
- OCLC: 2020128
- Dewey Decimal: 813/.5/4
- LC Class: PZ4.P618 Wo PS3566.I4

Woman on the Edge of Time is a 1976 feminist science fiction novel by American writer Marge Piercy. The novel was originally published by Alfred A. Knopf. Piercy draws on several inspirations to write this novel such as utopian studies, technoscience, socialization, and female fantasies. One of Piercy's main inspirations for her utopian novels is Plato's Republic. Piercy describes the novel as, "if only…"

== Plot summary ==
In the 1970s, impoverished yet intelligent thirty-seven-year-old Mexican-American Consuelo "Connie" Ramos, a resident of Spanish Harlem, is unfairly incarcerated in a New York mental hospital due to her supposed violent criminal tendencies. She had been recently released from a previous voluntary commitment in a mental institution after an episode of drug-related child neglect, which led her to lose custody of her daughter. Connie is caught within the government welfare and child custody labyrinth of 1970s New York City. She is after the first scene recommitted involuntarily by her niece's pimp on grounds of violent behavior, after she strikes him in the course of protecting her niece, Dolly (Dolores), from him. Dolly had sought Connie's protection because she was being forced by the pimp into having an illegal abortion.

One of Connie's chief abilities is her perceptiveness and empathy. As a result, before being committed, Connie had for some time begun to communicate with ("receive" from) a figure from the future: an androgynous young woman named Luciente. Connie retains her visions and her connection, which become more and more real, even while heavily drugged in the mental hospital, based loosely on Bellevue and other mental institutions from that period. Luciente is time-traveling from a future (the date is given as 2137), in which a number of goals of the political and social agenda of the late 1960s and early 1970s radical movements have been fulfilled. Environmental pollution, patriarchy, homelessness, homophobia, racism, ethnocentrism, phallogocentrism, sexism, class-subordination, food injustice, consumerism, imperialism, and totalitarianism have been effectively dealt with in this world, which is governmentally decentralized in a loose version of anarchism.

In contrast to the contemporary 1970s setting in an abusive mental institution where patients are labelled "violent," "incapable," "irrational," etc. on the basis of their response to an unjust and harshly stratified class-, race-, and gender-ridden society, future dwellers experience enormous personal freedom and train one another in self-control and ways of producing win-win results in all social situations. In particular, the subjects of volition and free will, mental institutionalization, and interference in others' willed actions are key to the vision of the utopian future. Connie is introduced by Luciente to the agrarian, income-sharing community of Mattapoisett, where children grow up in a culture where they are encouraged to know themselves and their own minds and emotions thoroughly through practicing a type of meditation from an early age ("in-knowing"), in the service of social harmony and the ability to communicate with others without domination or subservience.

This classless, gender-neutral (non-gendered pronouns are used, notably "person" for he/she and "per" for hers/his), racial-difference-affirming society is sketched in detail, including meeting and discussion structures that eliminate power differentials as much as possible, the extensive use of technology only for social good, the replacement of business and corporate agendas with general planning for social justice and respect for all human beings' individuality. Disputes between towns and regions are settled peacefully through discussion and merit-based competition of ideas, with the winning parties being obliged to "throw a big party for" or otherwise conciliate the losers in each case, in order to maintain friendly relations.

A 1970s emphasis on individual freedom can be seen at times: each person lives in a private tent or one-room home, and children develop outside the womb of an individual and are adopted by three "mothers" (of any gender) who guard and teach them only until puberty; every person chooses per own name, and can also choose per's field of study and work, as well as when to disengage from per community, or join a new one; total freedom also applies to one's mental and emotional choices: In this future world, one can check oneself into and out of the equivalent of a sanitorium at will, go into or out of various kinds of therapy, or take a mental break in some other way, and no other person has the right to choose this on one's behalf. One's field of work is self-chosen, and dicta apply to both one's life path and one's mental or emotional desires, needs, and capacities: "Per must not do what per cannot do" and "Per must do what per needs to do" are applied to both personal/emotional and professional life choices insofar as possible. There are limits to this utopia, which threaten always at the margins: the death penalty is imposed for repeated violent behaviour, and war is in the background, but both are considered extreme and unusual measures.

Connie learns tools of emotional and physical survival from Luciente and the future population of Mattapoisett, and comes to feel that she is living at an important time in history, and that she herself is in a pivotal position; her actions and decisions will determine the course of history. However, after returning to the present, Connie is signed up for an experimental procedure by her brother, one intended to “cure” her illness by releasing chemicals into her brain every time she feels a negative emotion. Her implant, however, is removed because her frequent trips to visit Luciente result in her lying for hours in a coma-like state, which worries the doctors. During this time, Connie visits another future, possibly caused by a butterfly effect resulting from her surgery. In particular, it is slowly revealed that Luciente's utopia is only one possible future; alternate futures are a possibility, and the novel shows us one example: a future consumerist, hyper-capitalist, environmentally sick and strictly classist, racist, and gender-stratified society in which a wealthy elite, known as the "richies" live on space platforms, sustaining themselves by dominating and exploiting the majority of the population through total control of knowledge and technology, personal control extending to physical "farming" of bodies (harvesting organs regularly) and the surgical control of moods through the use of psychotropic drugs. Women in this intensely violent, misogynistic and homophobic world of what is now known as "New New York" are valued and "grown" solely for appearance and sexuality, and plastic surgery that gives women grotesquely exaggerated sexual features is commonplace. Climate change has also negatively affected this alternative future, forcing humanity to live in skyscrapers where they are segregated by class, now known as "flacks." Connie encounters a prostitute in this future named Gildina 547-921-45-822-KBJ, whose views differ from that of Luciente's. People in this future are effectively dehumanized by being given a first name and a number tag to replace their last name, effectively eroding the barrier between person and commodity. After Connie and Gildina's conversation is interrupted by a guard on Gildina's floor, Connie immediately returns to the present before she can be attacked.

It does not decide for the reader whether Connie's visions are by-products of her mental instability or are literal time-travel, but ultimately, Connie's confrontation with the future inspires her to violent revolt against her institutional captors. After a visit to her brother where she is able to steal a fast-acting and lethal poison, she makes one last visit to Mattapoisett to say goodbye to Luciente and her new friends. Luciente's romantic partner Jackrabbit has been killed; however, which can be seen as a reflection of Connie's tragic romances. After returning to the present, she dumps the poison into the coffee pot of the doctors in charge of the experiments. She uses her limited means, despite her very restricted situation, in a desperate and apparently heroic way to prevent the dissemination of the mind-control technology that makes the future dystopia possible, putting an end to the mind-control experiments and prevents the lobotomy operation that had been planned for her and hundreds of other imprisoned patients. Connie acts in the tradition of revolts by oppressed or subaltern classes to put a wrench into the system of oppression within which she is caught. Though her revolutionary action ensures her own permanent incarceration and possible death sentence, and may not ensure the existence of the Mattapoisett future, Connie nevertheless sees her act as a victory, and perhaps the reader is encouraged to agree: "I'm a dead woman now too. … But I did fight them. … I tried."

== Major themes ==
=== Social transformation ===
The essence of Piercy's utopian vision is social transformation achieved after the existing civilization had been destroyed through environmental degradation and war. "The transformation of existing society into utopia is a precarious enterprise attainable only through a process of making choices and crossing boundaries." Descriptions of Mattapoisett, the potential future society described in the novel, emphasize that collective struggle has led to their egalitarian lifestyle and collective action is how they get along so well. "What is most important in Piercy's concern with activism is the basic connection between personal action and historical change itself. The revolution is not inevitable. It is a process of change that may require appropriate conditions and happen more readily at particular historical moments, but it will not happen at all without personal commitment and struggle." The reader is left to decide whether Mattapoisett and the self-determination of its inhabitants are real or figments of Connie's imagination. "By couching the reality of Connie's visions in ambiguity, the text questions the idealism of utopian thinking while showing that social change nevertheless starts in the realm of ideas." The novel criticizes mental institutions and hospitalization of its time extensively, and brings the problem of free will to the forefront as well as suggesting alternative routes to mental wellness and social reform. Throughout the novel, Piercy demonstrates that violence is the key to getting change to occur. Connie's revolt against the system may have been unsuccessful, but it had inspired others to continue to fight. This overarching theme ties into real life as feminists and other activist groups have fought for social change during the 1970s.

=== Feminism ===
Piercy has described Mattapoisett as not a utopia "because it's accessible. There's almost nothing there except the brooder not accessible now. So it's hardly a utopia; it is very intentionally not a utopia because it is not strikingly new. The ideas are the ideas basically of the women's movement." Each character in Mattapoisett has a counterpart in Connie's present world, juxtaposing differences in personal power hence, opportunities for self-actualization. For example, Connie's friend Skip who has been committed to the mental institution by his father for being gay reminds her of Jackrabbit, a bisexual person who is not only accepted but very popular in Mattapoisett. In stark contrast to the mental hospital where the doctors are all men, in Mattapoisett, women have a special tradition and role in healing, and positions of power rotate among men and women alike. Even traditional parental power has been done away with, and the experience of motherhood is shared among women and men, as technology has been developed to gestate babies in a mechanical brooder and men have been enabled to breast-feed. Motherhood is seen as a duty to be shared equally by each parent, regardless of gender. "In addition, critics have treated the novel as an allegory for the conflict in academia between dogmatic feminism and the commitment to motherhood." "The deconstruction of power structures is continued on a linguistic level, where Piercy deletes the dimorphism of the objective and possessive pronouns 'his' and 'her,' which have been replaced with the unisex 'per' referencing the single personal pronoun 'person.'" Feminist futurists argue that Piercy's nonlinear and complex structure of the novel leads to a more broad argument in regards to feminism. This idea is arguing to show that in order to deal with feminist solutions for the future, that there are problems from the past that must be addressed.

=== LGBTQIA+ equality ===
The idea of queer characters can be seen throughout the novel with Skip, Jackrabbit, and Luciente. Piercy shows the Skip going to a mental hospital for being gay showcasing her continuation of struggle other individuals. Also, Luciente has a queer relationship with her friend Diana. Piercy through this novel shows through the struggles of queer characters that there is progress to be made for those who are queer. Connie goes through a journey in Mattiposett in regards to the queer characters as she associates gendered roles to parents of the children. This is disproven by Luciente as they have both masculine and feminine qualities while in a queer relationship. Connie soon adapts to this idea by and begins to embrace homosexuality casting aside her patriarchal ideals from her present time. Through Piercy's portrayal of Connie's adaptation to Mattipoisett's homosexual relationships, it continues to show Piercy's point of queer progress in the novel.

== Literary significance and reception ==
Early reviews called the novel absorbing and exciting and beautifully written, but also polemical and didactic. Piercy's utopia was noted for "literally embodying every ideal of the counterculture/Movement: ecological wisdom, community, androgyny, ritual, respect for madness, propertylessness, etc." At the time, leaving the Sixties behind, American novels generally shared a post-apocalyptic feeling, asking "what are to be the new social and spiritual arrangements now that the old ones are completely shattered?" In that context, Roger Sale, in the New York Times, found nothing new in Woman on the Edge of Time, calling the book imitative and derivative, and pointing out that "the major instruments … are terribly familiar pieces of apparatus, the mental hospital and a utopian community of the future." Academic reviews, however, placed the novel among the important innovative fiction of the mid-1970s, characteristically works of social realism, all in some way describing a "new consciousness," "even though they don't always use the techniques of verisimilitude, and despite the mythical dimension of their representative characters."

Combining feminist ideals with utopian visions of a future society based on principles of community and equality, Piercy imagined a post-apocalyptic world that established Woman on the Edge of Time as an early feminist innovation in the traditionally male genre of dystopian fiction. Depictions of sexuality and relations between the genders were already recognized as useful elements in depicting the conflict between individual and societal demands. "For example, the governments of dystopian societies like those described in We, Brave New World, and 1984 all focus on sexuality as a crucial matter for their efforts at social control. And it is also clear that this focus comes about largely because of a perception on the part of these governments that sexuality is a potential locus of powerful subversive energies." Woman on the Edge of Time "finely counterpoints the utopianism of Mattapoisset with the dystopian realism with which Connie's actual world is represented." The novel has been analyzed as a dystopia, as speculative fiction, and as realist fiction with fantastic episodes. "By her vivid and coherent descriptions of new social institutions, Piercy has answered the famous Cold War dystopias like 1984 and Brave New World which lament that there is no possibility of imagining an anti-totalitarian society." The book is often compared with other feminist utopian or dystopian fantasies such as Ursula K. Le Guin's The Dispossessed and The Left Hand of Darkness, Joanna Russ's The Female Man, Angela Carter's The Passion of New Eve, and Margaret Atwood's The Handmaid's Tale.
