= Vidas Cruzadas (web series) =

- Genre: Telenovela
- Written by: Estela Sainz
- Directed by: Luis Vélez
- Starring: Kate del Castillo; Guy Ecker; Alma Delfina; Sofia Stamatiades; Joaquin Garrido; Marco Javier; Shaula Vega; Romia Peniche
- Opening theme: "El Culpable Soy Yo" (Cristian Castro)
- Country of origin: United States
- Original language: Spanish
- No. of episodes: 15

Production
- Producers: Carlos Sotomayor; Estela Sainz; Guy Ecker; Kate del Castillo
- Running time: 3–5 minutes

Original release
- Network: Univision
- Release: August 12 – September 16, 2009

Vidas Cruzadas (Crossed Lives) is a webnovela which premiered on Univision.com. After a legal dispute between Televisa and Univision, for the rights of Vidas Cruzadas, it finally premiered on Univision.com on August 12, 2009. The web cast of this new novel has brought together two major actors on the small screen: Kate del Castillo and Guy Ecker, who have been regarded as the most successful romantic couple. The 15-episode series consists of 5-to-7-minute episodes that are available exclusively to Univision.com users. Now different from the daily novela format, this only will "air" 3 times per week, which has some viewers confused judging from the comments left on the pages. It "airs" on Mondays, Wednesdays, and Fridays. Vidas Cruzadas is supported with a dedicated microsite featuring behind-the-scenes videos and photos and interactive features such as blogs, live chats, and forums. Other interactive features include a sweepstakes, allowing users to act out a scene and upload their videos for a chance to win a cameo in the show. The story has all the makings of a modern love dilemma: A successful career woman's biological clock is running out, and just as she decides to be a single mom through in-vitro, she meets the man of her dreams. Vidas Cruzadas was a project that took almost 3 years to come to reality.

== Synopsis ==
Mariana is a writer for a local magazine for women. She is a woman who most wants motherhood. After ending a relationship with a singer, Mariana decides she can no longer keep waiting for a partner. Convinced that she has no other option, follow the advice of her best friend and takes an unconventional step that her parents do not support.

Mariana decided to turn to artificial insemination and raise her son alone. After making this difficult decision, Mariana meets Daniel, a charming man, independent and single, who despite being a good player has not had a serious relationship since he ended with his girlfriend for a betrayal.

Daniel lost all interest in commitment, especially marriage. However, that soon changed when Mariana came into his life. Now Mariana must decide to come clean and tell Daniel what she did, and uncover a truths that change her and Daniel's lives forever.

== Cast ==
- Kate del Castillo as Mariana
- Guy Ecker as Daniel
- Shaula Vega as Gloria
- Sofia Lama as Lucy
- Joaquín Garrido as José / Mariana's Father
- Alma Delfina as Lupe / Mariana's Mother
- Rodrigo de la Rosa as Raúl
- Alberto Zeni as Max
- Romina Peniche as Gina
- Alek Carrera as Gerardo
- Paulina Garcés as Andrea
- Christian Lanz as Jorge
- Marco Javier as Uncle Luis
- Art Bonilla as Mariachi – Doctor
- Blanca Wilterdinck as Executive
- Adriana Guzmán as Receptionist #1
- Nancy Victoria as Receptionist #2
- Fernanda Kelly as Receptionist #3
- Berenice Noriega as Nurse
- Felipe Cuevas as Chucho
- Martín Turman as Waiter #1
- Adrián García as Waiter #2
- Antonio de Carlo as Insurance Agent #1
- Alejandro Antonio as Insurance Agent #2
- Estefanía Iglesias as Woman #1
- Andre Howie as Valet
- Chrissie Kirk as Mom with a kid
- María Beck as Latina Woman
- Lizzet López as Woman that helps
- Ben Dixon as American Guy

== Episodes ==
Season	Episodes	Originally released	
Season	Episodes	First released	Last released
1	15	August 12, 2009	September 16, 2009
