= Vida (novel) =

1979 novel by Marge Piercy

- First edition
- Author: Marge Piercy
- Language: English
- Genre: Political fiction, Revolutionary fiction
- Publisher: Summit Books
- Publication date: 1979
- Publication place: United States
- Media type: Print (Hardcover and Paperback)
- Pages: 416 pp
- ISBN: 0671401106
- Dewey Decimal: 813/.5/4

Vida is a 1979 novel by Marge Piercy.

== Summary ==
The eponymous heroine is a 1960s anti-war and pro-environmental activist who has in the modern day (1980s—when the novel was written and is partially-set) become part of an illegal underground revolutionary network which resembles the real Weatherman (later known as the Weather Underground). The story is told in the then present-day and in flashbacks to the 1960s. Vida struggles to maintain a double life; still having contacts with legitimate members of society, notably her lover Leigh, while continuing to carry out illegal actions against the government.

The novel is notable for describing what everyday-life was like for 60s radical fugitives living "underground", as Jo Walton writes:

Vida here is realising that the choices she has made have left her irrelevant not just politically but personally—her husband is marrying and having a baby with someone else, she is trapped with the other fugitives she increasingly dislikes, writing position papers nobody reads. She has false papers, a false name, she uses codes on the phone with her sister, she constantly has to appease people who are helping her. It’s very hard for her not to feel useless, because in fact she is useless, the revolution she was waiting for never happened, and she can’t be with the people she loves. And the other characters are just as real and well developed, even the minor characters.

== Reception ==
John Leonard wrote in the New York Times:

Vida is feisty, she is also emblematic. Marge Piercy, in her sixth novel, employs Vida to tell us exactly how it was in the lofts of the Left as the 1960s turned into the 1970s, as the massive peace marches turned into a tantrum of the cadres. This is the way everybody sounded, as if translated by thumb from the German and the Russian and the Chinese, at the endless meetings to establish policy. This is the way everybody behaved, in games of faction and musical beds. Here are the people who sold out -- to the media, the academy, the cops and medical school -- and those who persevered, in their purity and rage.

There is no reason to doubt that underground life for the radical fugitives is exactly as Miss Piercy describes it -- with pay phones ringing on prearranged hours on prearranged days, the switching of subways, the mail drop and the "safe house," the motel room and the Brooklyn Botanical Garden, the commune in Los Angeles and the A-frame in Vermont...

Cynthia Macdonald wrote in the Washington Post:

MARGE PIERCY's strong, complex yet lucid political novel is a flame-opus, not soap-opera, saved from being the latter by its incandescence... I welcome this book's complexities: solutions are struggled for in a way which not only illuminates but makes the reader think and feel.
