= Vida AB =

Swedish sawmill group

Vida AB is a sawmill group based in Alvesta, Sweden. It is the largest privately owned sawmill group in Sweden, and employs approximately 1,900 employees. The sawmills are strategically placed in or near the huge forest areas in south and middle of Sweden. About 85% of its produce is exported to Europe, USA, and Asia. The company produces animal bedding, fuel pellets, construction wood, among other products. 77% of the company's shares are owned by the Canfor Corporation, based in British Columbia, Canada.

The company owns the naming rights for Vida Arena, which is located in Växjö.
