= La hija del mariachi (2025 TV series) =

Colombian telenovela

- Genre: Telenovela
- Based on: La hija del mariachi by Mónica Agudelo
- Developed by: Gerardo Pinzón Ochoa
- Written by: Gerardo Pinzón Ochoa; Carolina López Rodríguez; Tatiana Andrade
- Directed by: Juan Carlos Mazo; Lucho Sierra
- Starring: Essined Aponte; Roberto Romano
- Composer: José Fernández
- Country of origin: Colombia
- Original language: Spanish
- No. of seasons: 1
- No. of episodes: 92

Production
- Executive producers: Ana María Pérez; Juan Pablo Posada; Yalile Giordanelli; Alexander Marín
- Producer: Carolina Vera
- Editor: Marcela Vásquez
- Production company: RCN Televisión

Original release
- Network: Canal RCN
- Release: 11 June – 31 October 2025

La hija del mariachi is a Colombian telenovela based on the 2006 telenovela of the same name created by Mónica Agudelo. The telenovela stars Essined Aponte and Roberto Romano. It aired on Canal RCN from 11 June 2025 to 31 October 2025.

== Cast ==
=== Main ===
- Essined Aponte as Rosario Guerrero
- Roberto Romano as Emiliano Sánchez Gallardo / Francisco Lara
- Brian Moreno as El Coloso de Jalisco
- Ignacio Riva as Miguel Corona
- Santana Rosa as Katia Mora
- Juan Cruz as Mañanitas
- Tuto Patiño as Fernando Molina "El Milamores"
- Ramsés Ramos as Sigifredo
- Ilenia Antonini as Ivel Santana
- Julián Trujillo as Gregorio
- Sofía Lama as Guadalupe Morales
- Erick Chapa as Martín
- Denia Agalianou as Miranda

=== Recurring and guest stars ===
- Francisco Avendaño
- Luis Eduardo Arango
- Marcela Gallego as Raquel
- Victor Cifuentes
- Juan Esteban Quintero
- Vanessa Silva
- Alejandro Lombana
- Eddy Rivera
- Lina Galindez
- William Leandro
- Luna Castaño
- Pablo Rios
- Tommy Vásquez as Chile Bazán

== Production ==
In August 2024, it was reported that RCN Televisión was developing a remake of La hija del mariachi. On 3 December 2024, Essined Aponte and Roberto Romano were announced in the lead roles. On 24 December 2024, the remake was officially announced by RCN. Filming of the telenovela began in January 2025. The main cast was announced on 3 April 2025.

== Ratings ==
Season	Timeslot (COT)	Episodes	First aired		Last aired		Avg. viewers (in points)
Season	Timeslot (COT)	Episodes	Date	Viewers (in points)	Date	Viewers (in points)	Avg. viewers (in points)
1	Mon–Fri 9:30 p.m. (1–18); Mon–Fri 10:30 p.m. (19–53); Mon–Fri 11:00 p.m. (54–92)	53	11 June 2025	3.5	31 October 2025	N/A	2.1

== Episodes ==
No.	Title	Original release date	Colombia viewers (Rating points)
1	"Pérdidas y traiciones"	11 June 2025	3.5
2	"Emiliano planea su escape"	12 June 2025	N/A
3	"Rosario atropella a Emiliano"	13 June 2025	3.9
4	"Regreso musical en Plaza Garibaldi"	16 June 2025	2.5
5	"Sorpresas y amenazas"	17 June 2025	3.0
6	"Conexión de sabores"	18 June 2025	3.2
7	"Cocina de charro"	19 June 2025	3.3
8	"El primer beso"	20 June 2025	3.2
9	"Camino de ida"	24 June 2025	2.9
10	"Emiliano dice sí al Garibaldi"	25 June 2025	2.9
11	"En busca de Emiliano"	26 June 2025	3.1
12	"Una verdad que pesa"	27 June 2025	2.9
13	"La promesa de Rosario"	1 July 2025	3.2
14	"Notas amargas"	2 July 2025	3.4
15	"Heridas que no se ven"	3 July 2025	3.1
16	"Una canción llena de emociones"	4 July 2025	2.9
17	"Oportunidades florecen en Garibaldi"	7 July 2025	3.0
18	"Acordes de redención"	8 July 2025	3.0
19	"Que cante el corazón"	9 July 2025	1.7
20	"Un sueño hecho canción"	10 July 2025	1.8
21	"En el ojo de la tormenta"	11 July 2025	1.6
22	"Una serenata sincera"	14 July 2025	1.5
23	"El juego del Coloso"	17 July 2025	1.9
24	"Una nota para el olvido"	18 July 2025	2.0
25	"El junte musical"	21 July 2025	1.6
26	"Sueños en voz alta"	22 July 2025	N/A
27	"Todos hablan de Rosario"	23 July 2025	1.6
28	"Que suene el mariachi"	24 July 2025	2.1
29	"La audición de Rosario"	29 July 2025	1.2
30	"Dar el gran paso"	30 July 2025	2.2
31	"El día de los santos"	31 July 2025	1.6
32	"Una canción a medias"	1 August 2025	1.1
33	"Latidos al ritmo de amor"	4 August 2025	1.3
34	"Lejos de casa"	6 August 2025	2.3
35	"El tiempo se agota"	8 August 2025	1.6
36	"La cuerda tensa"	11 August 2025	1.7
37	"Recursos en cero"	12 August 2025	1.1
38	"Que no se apague la música"	13 August 2025	1.5
39	"Un milagro anónimo"	14 August 2025	1.7
40	"Cerca del corazón"	15 August 2025	1.3
41	"La casa de Mil Amores"	19 August 2025	1.3
42	"Volver a empezar"	20 August 2025	1.7
43	"Sospechas en el aire"	21 August 2025	1.5
44	"Todo se derrumba"	22 August 2025	N/A
45	"Un mariachi con honor"	25 August 2025	1.3
46	"El verdadero show"	26 August 2025	1.8
47	"Verso por verso"	27 August 2025	N/A
48	"La decisión de Ivel"	28 August 2025	1.6
49	"El Coloso en crisis"	29 August 2025	1.7
50	"El llamado del mariachi"	1 September 2025	1.4
51	"Corona apuesta por Rosario"	2 September 2025	N/A
52	"México en el horizonte"	3 September 2025	1.2
53	"Una cita con doble cara"	5 September 2025	1.3
54	"La línea roja"	8 September 2025	N/A
55	"Oscuras intenciones"	9 September 2025	N/A
56	"Los pasos de Emiliano"	10 September 2025	N/A
57	"Una estrategia perversa"	11 September 2025	N/A
58	"Corazón dividido"	12 September 2025	N/A
59	"Límites claros"	15 September 2025	N/A
60	"Corazón decepcionado"	16 September 2025	N/A
61	"Verdades dolorosas"	17 September 2025	N/A
62	"Pisando los talones"	18 September 2025	N/A
63	"Sin marcha atrás"	19 September 2025	N/A
64	"Adiós a Francisco"	22 September 2025	N/A
65	"Nostálgica ausencia"	23 September 2025	N/A
66	"Enfrentando al traidor"	24 September 2025	N/A
67	"Sentimiento de culpa"	25 September 2025	N/A
68	"Quitando máscaras"	26 September 2025	N/A
69	"Un solo camino"	29 September 2025	N/A
70	"Sin salida"	30 September 2025	N/A
71	"Una nueva negociación"	1 October 2025	N/A
72	"Cuando el río suena"	2 October 2025	N/A
73	"Una corazonada"	3 October 2025	N/A
74	"Identidad revelada"	6 October 2025	N/A
75	"Miedo y verdades"	7 October 2025	N/A
76	"Concierto cancelado"	8 October 2025	N/A
77	"El tiempo se acabó"	9 October 2025	N/A
78	"Amistad solitaria"	10 October 2025	N/A
79	"Contrato riesgoso"	14 October 2025	N/A
80	"Inocencia enredada"	15 October 2025	N/A
81	"Escape sospechoso"	16 October 2025	N/A
82	"Plaza Garibaldi en riesgo"	17 October 2025	N/A
83	"Ayuda desinteresada"	20 October 2025	N/A
84	"Creer en el amor"	21 October 2025	N/A
85	"Nuevas ilusiones"	22 October 2025	N/A
86	"Nace un amor"	23 October 2025	N/A
87	"Los alcances de Corona"	24 October 2025	N/A
88	"Al borde de la verdad"	27 October 2025	N/A
89	"Sentencia justa"	28 October 2025	N/A
90	"Pendiendo de un hilo"	29 October 2025	N/A
91	"Milagro de amor"	30 October 2025	N/A
92	"Vida soñada"	31 October 2025	N/A
